Ethnomusicology is the study of music from the cultural and social aspects of the people who make it. It encompasses distinct theoretical and methodical approaches that emphasize cultural, social, material, cognitive, biological, and other dimensions or contexts of musical behavior, in addition to the sound component. Within musical ethnography it is the first-hand personal study of musicking as known as the act of taking part in a musical performance. 

Folklorists, who began preserving and studying folklore music in Europe and the US in the 19th century, are considered the precursors of the field prior to the Second World War. The term ethnomusicology is said to have been coined by Jaap Kunst from the Greek words ἔθνος (ethnos, "nation") and μουσική (mousike, "music"), It is often defined as the anthropology or ethnography of music, or as musical anthropology. During its early development from comparative musicology in the 1950s, ethnomusicology was primarily oriented toward non-Western music, but for several decades it has included the study of all and any musics of the world (including Western art music and popular music) from anthropological, sociological and intercultural perspectives. Bruno Nettl once characterized ethnomusicology as a product of Western thinking, proclaiming that "ethnomusicology as western culture knows it is actually a western phenomenon"; in 1992, Jeff Todd Titon described it as the study of "people making music".

Definition
Stated broadly, ethnomusicology may be described as a holistic investigation of music in its cultural contexts. Combining aspects of folklore, psychology, cultural anthropology, linguistics, comparative musicology, music theory, and history, ethnomusicology has adopted perspectives from a multitude of disciplines. This disciplinary variety has given rise to many definitions of the field, and attitudes and foci of ethnomusicologists have evolved since initial studies in the area of comparative musicology in the early 1900s. When the field first came into existence, it was largely limited to the study of non-Western music—in contrast to the study of Western art music, which had been the focus of conventional musicology. In fact, the field was referred to early in its existence as "comparative musicology," defining Western musical traditions as the standard to which all other musics were compared, though this term fell out of use in the 1950s as critics for the practices associated with it became more vocal about ethnomusicology's distinction from musicology. Over time, the definition broadened to include study of all the musics of the world according to certain approaches.

While there is not a single, authoritative definition for ethnomusicology, a number of constants appear in the definitions employed by leading scholars in the field. It is agreed upon that ethnomusicologists look at music from beyond a purely sonic and historical perspective, and look instead at music within culture, music as culture, and music as a reflection of culture. In addition, many ethnomusicological studies share common methodological approaches encapsulated in ethnographic fieldwork, often conducting primary fieldwork among those who make the music, learning languages and the music itself, and taking on the role of a participant observer in learning to perform in a musical tradition, a practice Mantle Hood termed "bi-musicality". Musical fieldworkers often also collect recordings and contextual information about the music of interest. Thus, ethnomusicological studies do not rely on printed or manuscript sources as the primary source of epistemic authority. Ethnomusicologists developed a qualitative practice-based research method; DIY/DIA enthnography which stands for do it yourself + do it again.

History

While the traditional subject of musicology has been the history and literature of Western art music, ethnomusicology was developed as the study of all music as a human social and cultural phenomenon. Oskar Kolberg is regarded as one of the earliest European ethnomusicologists as he first began collecting Polish folk songs in 1839 (Nettl 2010, 33). Comparative musicology, the primary precursor to ethnomusicology, emerged in the late 19th century and early 20th century. The International Musical Society in Berlin in 1899 acted as one of the first centers for ethnomusicology. Comparative musicology and early ethnomusicology tended to focus on non-Western music, but in more recent years, the field has expanded to embrace the study of Western music from an ethnographic standpoint.

Theories and methods
Ethnomusicologists often apply theories and methods from cultural anthropology, cultural studies and sociology as well as other disciplines in the social sciences and humanities. Though some ethnomusicologists primarily conduct historical studies, the majority are involved in long-term participant observation. Therefore, ethnomusicological work can be characterized as featuring a substantial, intensive ethnographic component.

Anthropological and Musicological Approaches 
Two approaches to ethnomusicological studies are common: the anthropological and the musicological. Ethnomusicologists using the anthropological approach generally study music to learn about people and culture. Those who practice the musicological approach study people and cultures to learn about music. Charles Seeger differentiated between the two approaches, describing the anthropology of music as studying the way that music is a "part of culture and social life", while musical anthropology "studies social life as a performance," examining the way "music is part of the very construction and interpretation of social and conceptual relationships and processes."

Charles Seeger and Mantle Hood were two ethnomusicologists that adopted the musicological approach. Hood started one of the first American university programs dedicated to ethnomusicology, often stressing that his students must learn how to play the music they studied. Further, prompted by a college student's personal letter, he recommended that potential students of ethnomusicology undertake substantial musical training in the field, a competency that he described as "bi-musicality." This, he explained, is a measure intended to combat ethnocentrism and transcend problematic Western analytical conventions. Seeger also sought to transcend comparative practices by focusing on the music and how it impacted those in contact with it. Similar to Hood, Seeger valued the performance component of ethnomusicology.

Ethnomusicologists following the anthropological approach include scholars such as Steven Feld and Alan Merriam. The anthropological ethnomusicologists stress the importance of field work and using participant observation. This can include a variety of distinct fieldwork practices, including personal exposure to a performance tradition or musical technique, participation in a native ensemble, or inclusion in a myriad of social customs. Similarly, Alan Merriam defined ethnomusicology as "music as culture," and stated four goals of ethnomusicology: to help protect and explain non-Western music, to save "folk" music before it disappears in the modern world, to study music as a means of communication to further world understanding, and to provide an avenue for wider exploration and reflection for those who are interested in primitive studies. This approach emphasizes the cultural impact of music and how music can be used to further understand humanity.

The two approaches to ethnomusicology bring unique perspectives to the field, providing knowledge both about the effects culture has on music, and about the impact music has on culture.

Analysis

Problems of analysis 
The great diversity of musics found across the world has necessitated an interdisciplinary approach to ethnomusicological study. Analytical and research methods have changed over time, as ethnomusicology has continued solidifying its disciplinary identity, and as scholars have become increasingly aware of issues involved in cultural study (see Theoretical Issues and Debates). Among these issues are the treatment of Western music in relation to music from "other," non-Western cultures and the cultural implications embedded in analytical methodologies. Kofi Agawu (see 2000s) noted that scholarship on African music seems to emphasize difference further by continually developing new systems of analysis; he proposes the use of Western notation to instead highlight similarity and bring African music into mainstream Western music scholarship.

In seeking to analyze such a wide scope of musical genres, repertories, and styles, some scholars have favored an all-encompassing "objective" approach, while others argue for "native" or "subjective" methodologies tailored to the musical subject. Those in favor of "objective" analytical methods hold that certain perceptual or cognitive universals or laws exist in music, making it possible to construct an analytical framework or set of categories applicable across cultures. Proponents of "native" analysis argue that all analytical approaches inherently incorporate value judgments and that, to understand music it is crucial to construct an analysis within cultural context. This debate is well exemplified by a series of articles between Mieczyslaw Kolinski and Marcia Herndon in the mid-1970s; these authors differed strongly on the style, nature, implementation, and advantages of analytical and synthetic models including their own. Herndon, backing "native categories" and inductive thinking, distinguishes between analysis and synthesis as two different methods for examining music. By her definition, analysis seeks to break down parts of a known whole according to a definite plan, whereas synthesis starts with small elements and combines them into one entity by tailoring the process to the musical material. Herndon also debated on the subjectivity and objectivity necessary for a proper analysis of a musical system. Kolinski, among those scholars critiqued by Herndon's push for a synthetic approach, defended the benefits of analysis, arguing in response for the acknowledgment of musical facts and laws.

Analytical methodologies 
As a result of the above debate and ongoing ones like it, ethnomusicology has yet to establish any standard method or methods of analysis. This is not to say that scholars have not attempted to establish universal or "objective" analytical systems. Bruno Nettl acknowledges the lack of a singular comparative model for ethnomusicological study, but describes methods by Mieczyslaw Kolinski, Béla Bartók, and Erich von Hornbostel as notable attempts to provide such a model.

Perhaps the first of these objective systems was the development of the cent as a definitive unit of pitch by phonetician and mathematician Alexander J. Ellis (1885). Ellis made notable contributions to the foundations of comparative musicology and ultimately ethnomusicology with the creation of the cents system; in fact, the ethnomusicologist Hornbostel “declared Ellis the ‘true founder of comparative scientific musicology.’” Prior to this invention, pitches were described by using measurements of frequency, or vibrations per second. However, this method was not reliable, “since the same interval has a different reading each time it occurs across the whole pitch spectrum.” On the other hand, the cents system allowed any interval to have a fixed numerical representation, regardless of its specific pitch level. Ellis used his system, which divided the octave into 1200 cents (100 cents in each Western semitone), as a means of analyzing and comparing scale systems of different musics. He had recognized that global pitch and scale systems were not naturally occurring in the world, but rather “artifices” created by humans and their “organized preferences,” and they differed in various locations. In his article in the Journal of the Society of Arts and Sciences, he mentions different countries such as India, Japan, and China, and notes how the pitch systems varied “not only [in] the absolute pitch of each note, but also necessarily the intervals between them.” From his experiences with interviewing native musicians and observing the variations in scales across the locations, he concludes that “there is no practical way of arriving at the real pitch of a musical scale, when it cannot be heard as played by a native musician” and even then, “we only obtain that particular musician’s tuning of the scale.” Ellis's study is also an early example of comparative musicological fieldwork (see Fieldwork).

Alan Lomax's method of cantometrics employed analysis of songs to model human behavior in different cultures. He posited that there is some correlation between musical traits or approaches and the traits of the music's native culture. Cantometrics involved qualitative scoring based on several characteristics of a song, comparatively seeking commonalities between cultures and geographic regions.

Mieczyslaw Kolinski measured the exact distance between the initial and final tones in melodic patterns. Kolinski refuted the early scholarly opposition of European and non-European musics, choosing instead to focus on much-neglected similarities between them, what he saw as markers of "basic similarities in the psycho-physical constitution of mankind." Kolinski also employed his method to test, and disprove, Erich von Hornbostel's hypothesis that European music generally had ascending melodic lines, while non-European music featured descending melodic lines.

Adopting a more anthropological analytical approach, Steven Feld conducted descriptive ethnographic studies regarding "sound as a cultural system." Specifically, his studies of Kaluli people of Papua New Guinea use sociomusical methods to draw conclusions about its culture.

Fieldwork

Bruno Nettl, Emeritus Professor of Musicology at Illinois University, defines fieldwork as "direct inspection [of music, culture, etc] at the source", and states that "It is in the importance of fieldwork that anthropology and ethnomusicology are closest: It is a 'hallmark' of both fields, something like a union card". However, he mentions that ethnomusicological fieldwork differs from anthropological fieldwork because the former requires more “practical” information about “recording, filming, video-taping, [and] special problems of text-gathering.” The experience of an ethnomusicologist in the field is his/her data; experience, texts (e.g. tales, myths, proverbs), structures (e.g. social organization), and "imponderabilia of everyday life" all contribute to an ethnomusicologist's study. He also notes how ethnomusicological fieldwork “principally involves interaction with other humans” and is primarily about “day-to-day personal relationships,” and this shows the more “personal” side of the discipline. The importance of fieldwork in the field of ethnomusicology has required the development of effective methods to pursue fieldwork.

History of Fieldwork 
In the 19th century until the mid-20th century, European scholars (folklorists, ethnographers, and some early ethnomusicologists) who were motivated to preserve disappearing music cultures (from both in and outside of Europe), collected transcriptions or audio recordings on wax cylinders. Many such recordings were then stored at the Berliner Phonogramm-Archiv at the Berlin school of comparative musicology, which was founded by Carl Stumpf, his student Erich M. von Hornbostel, and medical doctor Otto Abraham. Stumpf and Hornbostel studied and preserved these recordings in the Berlin Archiv, setting the foundation for contemporary ethnomusicology. But, the "armchair analysis" methods of Stumpf and Hornbostel required very little participation in fieldwork themselves, instead using the fieldwork of other scholars. This differentiates Stumpf and Hornbostel from their present-day contemporaries, who now use their fieldwork experience as a main component in their research.

Ethnomusicology's transition from "armchair analysis" to fieldwork reflected ethnomusicologists trying to distance themselves from the field of comparative musicology in the period following World War II. Fieldwork emphasized face-to-face interaction to gather the most accurate impression and meaning of music from the creators of the music, in contrast with "armchair analysis" that disconnected the ethnomusicologist from the individual or group of performers.

Stumpf and Hornbostel were not the only scholars to use "armchair" analysis. Other scholars analyzed recordings and transcriptions that they did not make. For instance, in his work Hungarian Folk Music, Béla Bartók analyzes various traits of Hungarian folk songs. These transcriptions came in recorded and printed format, and form the majority of Bartók's source material.

In 1935, the journal American Anthropologist published an article titled "Plains Ghost Dance and Great Basin Music," authored by George Herzog. Herzog was an assistant to Hornbostel and Stumpf. Herzog draws from material "available to [him]" and "in the literature," including transcriptions by James Mooney for the Bureau of American Ethnology; Natalie Curtis, and Alice C. Fletcher. Herzog analyzes structure and melodic contour of Ghost Dance songs. He notes that Ghost Dance music's "paired patterns" occur in many Native American tribes' music, and they may have migrated from tribe to tribe.

Writing later in the 1950s, Jaap Kunst wrote about fieldwork for the purpose of recording and transcribing sound. Kunst lists various "phonogram-archives," collections of recorded sound. They include the archives founded by Stumpf.

Among other developments, the 1950s and 1960s saw the expansion of fieldwork, as opposed to "armchair" analysis. In 1950, David McAllester conducted a study of Navajo music, particularly the music of the Enemy Way ceremony. The work was published as Enemy Way Music: A Study of Social and Esthetic Values As Seen in Navaho Music. In it, McAllester details the procedures of the Enemy Way ceremony, as well as the music itself.

Aside from Enemy Way music, McAllester sought Navajo cultural values based on analysis of attitudes toward music. To his interviewees, McAllester gave a questionnaire, which includes these items:

 Some people beat a drum when they sing; what other things are used like that?
 What did people say when you learned how to sing?
 Are there different ways of making the voice sound when we sing?
 Are there songs that sound especially pretty?
 What kind of melody do you like better: (illustrate with a chant-like melody and a more varied one).
 Are there songs for men only? [for women only? for children only?]

The ethnomusicologist Alan Merriam reviewed McAllester's work, calling it "strange to speak of a work published in 1954 as 'pioneering,' but this is precisely the case." He described McAllester's work as "[relating] music to culture and culture to music in terms of the value system of the Navaho [sic]." As of 1956, the time that Merriam published his review, the idea of such work "occurred to ethnomusicologists with surprising infrequency."

In his work The Anthropology of Music, published in 1964, Merriam wrote that "ethnomusicology has suffered from the amateur field collector whose knowledge of its aims has been severely restricted. Such collectors operate under the assumption that the important point is simply to gather music sound, and that this sound–often taken without discrimination and without thought, for example, to problems of sampling–can then simply be turned over to the laboratory worker to do something about it."

In the same work, Merriam states that "what the ethnomusicologist does in the field is determined by his own formulation of method, taken in its broadest sense." Fieldwork can have multiple areas of inquiry, and Merriam lists six of these:

 Musical material culture: classification of instruments, cultural perception of musical instruments.
 Song texts.
 Categories of music: "envisaged by [...] the people themselves as various separable types of songs."
 The musician: "the training of musicians and the means of becoming a musician"; perceptions of musicians."
 The uses and functions of music in relation to other aspects of culture.
 Music as a creative cultural activity: "what are the sources from which music is drawn?"

Bruno Nettl describes early 20th-century fieldwork as extraction of music, which is analyzed elsewhere. Between 1920 and 1960, however, fieldworkers wished to map entire musical systems, and resided longer in the field. After the 1950s, some not only observed, but also participated in musical cultures.

Mantle Hood wrote about this practice as well. Hood had learned from musicians in Indonesia about the intervals of sléndro scales, as well as how to play the rebab. He was interested in the characteristics of Indonesian music, as well as "social and economic valuations" of music.

By the 1980s, participant-observer methodology became the norm, at least in the North American tradition of ethnomusicology.

Aside from this history of fieldwork, Nettl writes about informants: the people whom fieldworkers research and interview. Informants do not contain the entirety of a musical culture, and need not represent the ideal of the culture. According to Nettl, there is a bell-shaped curve of musical ability. In a community, the majority are "simply good" at their music. They are of greatest interest. However, it is also worth seeing who a community recommends as informants. People may direct a fieldworker to the best musicians, or they may suggest many "simply good" musicians. This attitude is reflective of the culture's values.

As technology advanced, researchers graduated from depending on wax cylinders and the phonograph to digital recordings and video cameras, allowing recordings to become more accurate representations of music studied. These technological advances have helped ethnomusicologists be more mobile in the field, but have also let some ethnomusicologists shift back to the "armchair analysis" of Stumpf and Hornbostel. Since video recordings are now considered cultural texts, ethnomusicologists can conduct fieldwork by recording music performances and creating documentaries of the people behind the music, which can be accurately studied outside of the field. Additionally, the invention of the internet and forms of online communication could allow ethnomusicologists to develop new methods of fieldwork within a virtual community.

Heightened awareness of the need to approach fieldwork in an ethical manner arose in the 1970s in response to a similar movement within the field of anthropology. Mark Slobin writes in detail about the application of ethics to fieldwork. Several potential ethical problems that arise during fieldwork relate to the rights of the music performers. To respect the rights of performers, fieldwork often includes attaining complete permission from the group or individual who is performing the music, as well as being sensitive to the rights and obligations related to the music in the context of the host society.

Another ethical dilemma of ethnomusicological fieldwork is the inherent ethnocentrism (more commonly, eurocentrism) of ethnomusicology. Anthony Seeger has done seminal work on the notion of ethics within fieldwork, emphasizing the need to avoid ethnocentric remarks during or after the field work process. Emblematic of his ethical theories is a 1983 piece that describes the fundamental complexities of fieldwork through his relationship with the Suyá Indians of Brazil. To avoid ethnocentrism in his research, Seeger does not explore how singing has come to exist within Suyá culture, instead explaining how singing creates culture presently, and how aspects of Suyá social life can be seen through both a musical and performative lens. Seeger's analysis exemplifies the inherent complexity of ethical practices in ethnomusicological fieldwork, implicating the importance for the continual development of effective fieldwork in the study of ethnomusicology.

Systematized Fieldwork 
In his 2005 paper "Come Back and See Me Next Tuesday," Nettl asks whether ethnomusicologists can, or even should practice a unified field methodology as opposed to each scholar developing their own individual approach. Nettl considers several factors when sampling music from different cultures. The first thing is that in order to discover the best representation of any culture, it is important to be able to “discern between ordinary experience and ideal,” all while considering the fact that “the ‘ideal’ musician may also know and do things completely outside the ken of the rest.” Another factor is the process of selecting teachers, which depends on what the fieldworker wishes to accomplish. Regardless of whatever method a fieldworker decides to use to conduct research, fieldworkers are expected to “show respect for their material and for the people with whom they work.” As Nettl explains, ethnomusicology is a field heavily relies on both the collection of data and the development of strong personal relationships, which often cannot be quantified by statistical data. He summarizes Bronisław Malinowski's classification of anthropological data (or, as Nettl applies it, ethnomusicological data) by outlining it as three types of information: 1) texts, 2) structures, and 3) the non-ponderable aspects of everyday life. The third type of information, Nettl claims is the most important because it captures the ambiguity of experience that cannot be captured well through writing. He cites another attempt made by Morris Friedrich, an anthropologist, to classify field data into fourteen different categories in order to demonstrate the complexity that information gathered through fieldwork contains. There are a myriad of factors, many of which exist beyond the researcher's comprehension, that prevent a precise and accurate representation of what one has experienced in the field. As Nettl notices, there is a current trend in ethnomusicology to no longer even attempt to capture a whole system or culture, but to focus on a very specific niche and try to explain it thoroughly. Nettl's question, however, still remains: should there be a uniform method for going about this type of fieldwork?

Alan Merriam addresses issues that he found with ethnomusicological fieldwork in the third chapter of his 1964 book, The Anthropology of Music. One of his most pressing concerns is that, as of 1964 when he was writing, there had been insufficient discussion among ethnomusicologists about how to conduct proper fieldwork. That aside, Merriam proceeds to characterize the nature of ethnomusicological fieldwork as being primarily concerned with the collection of facts. He describes ethnomusicology as both a field and a laboratory discipline. In these accounts of the nature of ethnomusicology, it seems to be closely related to a science. Because of that, one might argue that a standardized, agreed-upon field method would be beneficial to ethnomusicologists. Despite that apparent viewpoint, Merriam conclusively claims that there should be a combination of a standardized, scientific approach and a more free-form analytical approach because the most fruitful work he has done has come from combining those two rather than separating them, as was the trend among his contemporaries.

Even Merriam's once progressive notion of a balanced approach came into question as time passed. Specifically, the idea that ethnomusicology is or can be at all factual. In a 1994 book, May it Fill Your Soul: Experiencing Bulgarian Music, Timothy Rice uses enlightenment philosophy to substantiate his opinion that fieldwork cannot be used as fact. The philosophy he works with involves theorizing over the distinction between objectivity and subjectivity. In order to ground those debates in ethnomusicology, he equates musicology to objectivity and musical experience to subjectivity. Rice uses the philosophical attitudes that Martin Heidegger, Hans-Georg Gadamer, and Paul Ricoeur take towards objectivity and subjectivity to state that human perception of the world is inherently subjective because the only way in which humans can interpret what goes on around them is through symbols. Human preconceptions of those symbols will always influence the ways in which an individual might process the world around them. Applying that theory to music and ethnomusicology, Rice brings back the terms of musicology and musical experience. Because one's experience of music is simply an interpretation of preconceived symbols, one cannot claim musical experience as factual. Thus, systematizing fieldwork like one would a scientific field is a futile endeavor. Instead, Rice asserts that any attempt to engage with someone else's musical experience, which cannot be truly understood by anyone except that person, must be confined to individual analysis. Characterizing the musical experience of a whole culture, according to Rice's logic, is not possible.

Another argument against the objectivity and standardization of fieldwork comes from Gregory Barz and Tim Cooley in the second chapter of their book, Shadows in the Field: New Perspectives for Fieldwork in Ethnomusicology. In this chapter, entitled "Confronting the Field(Note): In and Out of the Field," they claim that a researcher's field work will always be personal because a field researcher in ethnomusicology, unlike a field researcher in a hard science, is inherently a participant in the group they are researching just by being there. To illustrate the disparity between those subjective, participatory experiences that ethnomusicological fieldworkers have and what typically gets published as ethnomusicological literature, Barz and Cooley point out the difference between field research and field notes. While field research attempts to find the reality, field notes document a reality. The issue, according to Barz and Cooley, is that field notes, which capture the personal experience of the researcher, are often omitted from whatever final writing that researcher publishes.

Ethical concerns and best practices

Heightened awareness of the need to approach fieldwork in an ethical manner arose in the 1970s in response to a similar movement within the field of anthropology. Mark Slobin writes in detail about the application of ethics to fieldwork. Several potential ethical problems that arise during fieldwork relate to the rights of the music performers. To respect the rights of performers, fieldwork often includes attaining complete permission from the group or individual who is performing the music, as well as being sensitive to the rights and obligations related to the music in the context of the host society.

Another ethical dilemma of ethnomusicological fieldwork is the inherent ethnocentrism (more commonly, eurocentrism) of ethnomusicology. Anthony Seeger, Emeritus Professor of Ethnomusicology at UCLA, has done seminal work on the notion of ethics within fieldwork, emphasizing the need to avoid ethnocentric remarks during or after the field work process. Emblematic of his ethical theories is a 1983 piece that describes the fundamental complexities of fieldwork through his relationship with the Suyá Indians of Brazil. To avoid ethnocentrism in his research, Seeger does not explore how singing has come to exist within Suyá culture, instead explaining how singing creates culture presently, and how aspects of Suyá social life can be seen through both a musical and performative lens. Seeger's analysis exemplifies the inherent complexity of ethical practices in ethnomusicological fieldwork, implicating the importance for the continual development of effective fieldwork in the study of ethnomusicology.

In recent decades, ethnomusicologists have paid greater attention to ensuring that their fieldwork is both ethically conducted and provides a holistic sense of the community or culture under study. As the demographic makeup of ethnomusicologists conducting research grows more diverse, the field has placed a renewed emphasis on a respectful approach to fieldwork that avoids stereotyping or assumptions about a particular culture. Rather than using European music as a baseline against which music from all other cultures is compared, researchers in the field often aim to place the music of a certain society in the context only of the culture under study, without comparing it to European models. In this way, the field aims to avoid an "us vs. them" approach to music.

Nettl and other scholars hope to avoid the perception of the "ugly ethnomusicologist," which carries with it the same negative connotations as the "ugly American" traveler. Many scholars, from Ravi Shankar to V. Kofi Agawu, have criticized ethnomusicology for, as Nettl puts it, "dealing with non-European music in a condescending way, treating it as something quaint or exotic." Nettl recalls an angry young man from Nigeria who asked the researcher how he could rationalize the study of other cultures' music. Nettl couldn't come up with an easy answer, and posits that ethnomusicologists need to be careful to respect the cultures they study and avoid treating valuable pieces of culture and music as just one of many artifacts they study.

Part of the problem, Nettl notes, is that the vast majority of ethnomusicologists are "members of Western society who study non-Western music," contributing to the perception that wealthy, white individuals are taking advantage of their privilege and resources. Researchers want to avoid the perception — accurate or exaggerated — that they're entering poorer and less technologically advanced communities, treating residents like test subjects, gleaning all they can, and then penning condescending reports about the quaintness of native music.

Researchers are optimistic that increased diversity within the field of ethnomusicology will help alleviate some ethical concerns. With more fieldwork of Western music and societies being conducted by researchers from underrepresented cultures — a reversal from the norm — some believe the field will reach a happy equilibrium. Author Charles Keil suggests that as "more of 'them' may want to study 'us,' a more interested anthropology will emerge ... in the sense of intersubjective, intercultural ... critical, revolutionary." American ethnomusicologist and Wesleyan University professor Mark Slobin notes that most ethical concerns stem from interactions that occur during fieldwork between the researcher and the informant, or member of the community being studied. Nettl, in a 2005 paper, described the feeling of being an outsider approaching a community — in this case, Native American — that he wanted to study. He said ethnomusicologists often face feelings of trepidation as they attempt to get to know the local populace and culture while attempting to avoid being exploitative. Researchers have different methods, but Nettl's is to be patient, as he obeys a Native American man's instruction to "come back and see me next Tuesday," even though the man has plenty of free time and could sing to Nettl in the moment.

Another way to ensure ethnomusicologists gain a complete understanding of the community they're studying is simply to spend more time in it.
In 1927, George Herzog spent two months with the Pima tribe in Arizona, an amount of time that would be considered short by today's standards — where periods of fieldwork can often last longer than a year. But Herzog recorded several hundred songs during that time, establishing a precedent for increasingly long field studies that have yielded more and more recordings. A lengthy period of fieldwork isn't useful, though, without proper techniques for ensuring the researcher gets a representative sampling of the music in a community. When he worked with the Blackfoot people, Nettl said he wasn't too concerned with whether the singer teaching him about Blackfoot music was good or bad, but did assume he would be representative of all Blackfoot singers. But Nettl soon gained a new perspective, and "no longer assumed that all informants in an indigenous society would tell me the same thing; I had discarded the idea of essential homogeneity." Despite discarding this assumption, Nettl acknowledges that by only interviewing one person, he is relying heavily on that person's ability to articulate a whole society's culture and musical traditions.

There are myriad other ethical considerations that arise in the field, and Slobin attempts to summarize and explain some that he's come across or heard about. Ethnomusicologists may face dilemmas related to their roles as archivists and historians, such as whether to purchase a rare, one-of-a-kind instrument and preserve it, or leave it with musicians who created it. They may encounter controversy over whether they are allowed to watch, participate in, or record various songs or dances, or over who should be allowed to view videos or other products of fieldwork after the researcher has returned home.

Theoretical issues and debates

Universals
Musicologists have long pondered the existence of universals in music. Despite the trope of music being a “universal language”, we have yet to find anyone that can indisputably point out concrete characteristics that all types of music have in common. If one were to ascertain one or multiple universals found in music, it would create a basis for which all music is defined on, which would drastically change the way that music study is conducted or regarded. Ethnomusicology is (debatably) a comparative and subjective field. Having a concrete definition of music would create a way for ethnomusicologists to objectively evaluate music and come up with more concrete conclusions based on this. It would also remove much of the bias within the field of ethnomusicology. Additionally, the definition of the field of ethnomusicology relies on an understood meaning of the word “music”; For these reasons, universals are highly sought after. Despite this, it is unknown whether or not such universals could even exist, which is why there is still a debate among ethnomusicologists. In a journal published in 1971 called Ethnomusicology, this debate was carried out among renowned ethnomusicologists from the Society of Ethnomusicology, as outlined below, which set forth the recurring ideas around this topic in the field.

Ethnomusicologists initially started to question the possibility of universals because they were searching for a new approach to explain musicology that differed from Guido Adler's. Ethnomusicologists worldwide have realized that culture has an important role in shaping aesthetic responses to music. This realization sparked controversy in the community, with debates questioning what people consider music, and whether perceptions of consonance and dissonance have a biological or cultural basis. Belief in universal traits of music was characteristic of nineteenth-century scholarship. Musicologists like Longfellow had written that Music is the universal language of mankind. The search for musical universalities has remained a topic amongst ethnomusicologists since Wilhelm Wundt, who tried to prove that "all 'primitive' peoples have monophonic singing and use intervals. Most musicians and even some teachers of Wundt's time believed that music was a universal language, resulting in the development of scholarship that dealt with only one kind of music and treated all other kinds as true relatives if distant of the Western canon. The assumption seemed to be that the basic principles of Western music were universally valid because it was the only "true" music. Later, by the 1990s it had become increasingly difficult to view the world of music without including some discussion about the notion of universals. Charles Seeger, for instance, categorized his interpretation of musical universals by using inclusion-exclusion styled Venn-diagrams to create five types universals, or absolute truths, of music. Universals in music are as hard to come by as universals in language since both potentially have a universal grammar or syntax. Dane Harwood noted that looking for causality relationships and "deep structure" (as postulated by Chomsky) is a relatively fruitless way to look for universals in music. In "The Universal Language." In The Study of Ethnomusicology: Thirty-One Issues and Concepts Bruno Nettl asserts that music is not a universal language and is more of a dialect because of the influence of culture on its creation and interpretation. Nettl shares the belief with his colleagues that trying to find a universal in music is unproductive because there will always be at least one instance proving that there is no musical universals. Nettl asserts that music is not the universal language, but musics are not as mutually unintelligible as languages. One should study the music of each society in its own terms and learn it individually, referred to as music's dialects rather than music's languages. Nettl concludes his writing by stating that despite the wide variety of musics, the ways in which people everywhere have chosen to sing and play are more alike than the boundaries of the imaginable might suggest. There are other ethnomusicologists that note the invailidity of music as a universal language. For example, George List writes, "I once knew a missionary who assured me that the Indians to whom he had ministered on the west coast of Mexico neither sang nor whistled." and ethnomusicologist David P. McAllester writes, "Any student of man must know that somewhere, someone is doing something that he calls music but nobody else would give it that name. That one exception would be enough to eliminate the possibility of a real universal." As a result of this gamesmanship of ethnomusicologists to poke holes in universals, focus shifted from trying to find a universal to trying to find near-universals, or qualities that may unite the majority of the world's musics.

In Some Thoughts on "Universals" in World Music, McAllester claims there are no absolute universals in music, but there are plenty near-universals in that all music has some tonal center, and establishes a tendency that emits a feeling and the performers of that music influences the way in which that tendency is felt or realized. Music transforms experience and each person feels something when they hear it. Music is the actualization of the mystical experience for everybody. The universality of music exists in its ability to effect the human-mind. McAllester was a believer in near universals, he wrote, "I will be satisfied if nearly everybody does it," which is why he postulated that nearly all music has a tonal center, has a tendency to go somewhere, and also has an ending. However McAllester's main point is that music transforms the everyday humdrum into something else, bringing about a heightened experience. He likens music to having an out of body experience, religion, and sex. It is music's ability to transport people mentally, that is in his opinion a near universal that almost all musics share.

In response to McAllester's Universal Perspectives on Music, Klaus P. Wachsmann counters that even a near universal is hard to come by because there are many variables when considering a very subjective topic like music and music should not be removed from culture as a singular variable. There is a universal understanding that music is not the same everywhere, and a conversation of the universality of music can only be held when omitting the word "music", or "universals", or both. Wachsmann thinks that resemblance may be the main influencer of what we call music and what we don't. His approach, instead of finding a universal, was to create an amalgam of relations for sound and psyche: "(1) the physical properties of the sounds, (2) the physiological response to the acoustic stimuli, (3) the perception of sounds as selected by the human mind that is programmed by previous experiences, and (4) the response to the environmental pressures of the moment. In this tetradic schema lies an exhaustive model of the universals in music." However, Wachsmann does allow that they all had some influenced experience and this belief is echoed by another ethnomusicologist who shares the belief that the universal lies in the specific way music reaches the listener. "Whatever it communicates is communicated to the members of the in-group only, whoever they may be. This is as true of in-groups in our own society as in any other. Does "classical" music communicate to every American? Does rock and roll communicate to every parent?" This relativity goes to prove that people are used to thinking of a certain phenomenon that marries indescribable components that we resemble to what we know as music from our reference. It is also here that Wachsmann acknowledges that part of the problem of identifying universals in music is that it requires a set definition of music, but he doesn’t think that the lack of a definition does not need to “disturb us unduly because usage will decide whether the emphasis is on primarily utilitarian speech or on speech that creates "special time" in a culture. And in any case, phenomena do have a way of belonging to more than one kind of continuum at the same time”.

Folklore specializing ethnomusicologist George List, in his book "On the Non-universality of Musical Perspectives", is in agreement with all within the discussion by saying that there is something unique that music produces, arguing that it always possesses significance to the group that it is produced by/around: “ Whatever [music] communicates is communicated to the members of the in-group only, whoever they may be. This is as true of in-groups in our own society as in any other”(List, 399). However, List deviates from McAllister, however, in saying that the “weakness” in his idea regarding music as a producer of “heightened experience” is that “it applies equally well to other arts, not only to music”, and therefore cannot be a universality of music, since it can’t be defined as a sole characteristic of music. List takes this thinking to Mcallister’s notion of music possessing tendency as well, stating that “all art forms, one might say every human activity, are patterned and show some form of organization, show ‘tendencies’.” Additionally, List acknowledges the problem of talking about universality in music while there isn’t an objective definition of music itself: “But words, as the [common definition suggests, are lexically meaningful while music is not. Since music is abstract how do we study and assess its production of ‘heightened experience’.”

Dane Harwood, in response to this debate, approached the question of universality in music in his article “Universals in Music: A Perspective from Cognitive Psychology”, years after the initial debate, from a psychology perspective. His view is that universals in music are not a matter of specific musical structure or function—but of basic human cognitive and social processes construing and adapting to the real world. He calls this the “information processing approach”, and argues that one must “examine music as a complex auditory stimulus which is somehow perceived, structured, and made meaningful by the human perceptual and cognitive system. From this point of view, we can search for perceptual and cognitive processes which all human beings apply to musical sound, and thus identify some processing universal”. He argues that this would adjust for the differences in context with which music is defined, produced, and observed, which would lead to insight into. “if there are universal cultural processes operating on musical information”. It is here that he takes a more technical turn and points to different musical phenomena and their relation to the way that humans process what they’re listening to. He argues that music is both a cultural and individual phenomenon, yet culture is something individuals learn about their worlds which is shared with others in the group.

One aspect of music is tuning, and recent work has shown that many musical traditions' tuning's notes align with their dominant instrument's timbre's partials and fall on the tuning continuum of the syntonic temperament, suggesting that tunings of the syntonic temperament (and closely related temperaments) may be a potential universal, thus explaining some of the variation among musical cultures (specifically and exclusively with regard to tuning and timbre) and possible limits on that variation.

Linguistics and semiotics
It is often the case that interests in ethnomusicology stem from trends in anthropology, and this no different for symbols. In 1949, anthropologist Leslie White wrote, "the symbol is the basic unit of all human behavior and civilization," and that use of symbols is a distinguishing characteristic of humans. Once symbolism was at the core of anthropology, scholars sought to examine music "as a symbol or system of signs or symbols," leading to the establishment of the field of musical semiotics. Bruno Nettl discusses various issues relating ethnomusicology to musical semiotics, including the wide variety of culturally dependent, listener-derived meanings attributed to music and the problems of authenticity in assigning meaning to music. Some of the meanings that musical symbols can reflect can relate to emotion, culture, and behavior, much in the same way that linguistic symbols function.

The interdisciplinarity of symbolism in anthropology, linguistics, and musicology has generated new analytical outlooks (see Analysis) with different focuses: Anthropologists have traditionally conceived of whole cultures as systems of symbols, while musicologists have tended to explore symbolism within particular repertories. Structural approaches seek to uncover interrelationships between symbolic human behaviors.

In the 1970s, a number of scholars, including musicologist Charles Seeger and semiotician Jean-Jacques Nattiez, proposed using methodology commonly employed in linguistics as a new way for ethnomusicologists to study music. This new approach, widely influenced by the works of linguist Ferdinand de Saussure, philosopher Charles Sanders Peirce, and anthropologist Claude Lévi-Strauss, among others, focused on finding underlying symbolic structures in cultures and their music.

In a similar vein, Judith Becker and Alton L. Becker theorized the existence of musical "grammars" in their studies of the theory of Javanese gamelan music. They proposed that music could be studied as symbolic and that it bears many resemblances to language, making semiotic study possible. Classifying music as a humanity rather than science, Nattiez suggested that subjecting music to linguistic models and methods might prove more effective than employing the scientific method. He proposed that the inclusion of linguistic methods in ethnomusicology would increase the field's interdependence, reducing the need to borrow resources and research procedures from exclusively other sciences.

John Blacking was another ethnomusicologist who sought to create an ethnomusicological parallel to linguistic models of analysis. In his work on Venda music, he writes, "The problem of musical description is not unlike that in linguistic analysis: a particular grammar should account for the processes by which all existing and all possible sentences in the language are generated." Blacking sought more than sonic description. He wanted to create a musical analytical grammar, which he coined the Cultural Analysis of Music, that could incorporate both sonic description and how cultural and social factors influence structures within music. Blacking desired a unified method of musical analysis that "...can not only be applied to all music, but can explain both the form, the social and emotional content, and the effects of music, as systems of relationships between an infinite number of variables." Like Nattiez, Blacking saw a universal grammar as a necessary for giving ethnomusicology a distinct identity. He felt that ethnomusicology was just a "meeting ground" for anthropology of music and the study of music in different cultures, and lacked a distinguishing characteristic in scholarship. He urged others in the field to become more aware and inclusive of the non-musical processes that occur in the making of music, as well as the cultural foundation for certain properties of the music in any given culture, in the vein of Alan Merriam's work.

Some musical languages have been identified as more suited to linguistically focused analysis than others. Indian music, for example, has been linked more directly to language than music of other traditions. Critics of musical semiotics and linguistic-based analytical systems, such as Steven Feld, argue that music only bears significant similarity to language in certain cultures and that linguistic analysis may frequently ignore cultural context.

Comparison
Since ethnomusicology evolved from comparative musicology, some ethnomusicologists' research features analytical comparison. The problems arising from using these comparisons stem from the fact that there are different kinds of comparative studies with a varying degree of understanding between them. Beginning in the late 60s, ethnomusicologists who desired to draw comparisons between various musics and cultures have used Alan Lomax's idea of cantometrics. Some cantometric measurements in ethnomusicology studies have been shown be relatively reliable, such as the wordiness parameter, while other methods are not as reliable, such as precision of enunciation. Another approach, introduced by Steven Feld, is for ethnomusicologists interested in creating ethnographically detailed analysis of people's lives; this comparative study deals with making pairwise comparisons about competence, form, performance, environment, theory, and value/equality. Bruno Nettl has noted as recently as 2003 that comparative study seems to have fallen in and out of style, noting that although it can supply conclusions about the organization of musicological data, reflections on history or the nature of music as a cultural artifact, or understanding some universal truth about humanity and its relationship to sound, it also generates a great deal of criticism regarding ethnocentrism and its place in the field.

Insider/outsider epistemology

The relevance and implications of insider and outsider distinctions within ethnomusicological writing and practice has been a subject of lengthy debate for decades, invoked by Bruno Nettl, Timothy Rice, and others. The question that causes such debate lies in the qualifications for an ethnomusicologist to research another culture when they represent an outsider, dissecting a culture that doesn't belong to them. Historically, ethnomusicological research was tainted with a strong bias from Westerners in thinking that their music was superior to the musics they researched. From this bias grew an apprehension of cultures to allow ethnomusicologists to study them, thinking that their music would be exploited or appropriated. There are benefits to ethnomusicological research, i.e. the promotion of international understanding, but the fear of this "musical colonialism" represents the opposition to an outsider ethnomusicologist in conducting his or her research on a community of insiders.

In The Study of Ethnomusicology: Thirty-One Issues and Concepts, Nettl discusses personal and global issues pertaining to field researchers, particularly those from a Western academic background. In a chapter that recounts his field recordings among Native Americans of the northern plains, for instance, he attempts to come to terms with the problematic history of ethnographic fieldwork, and envision a future trajectory for the practice in the 21st century and beyond. Considering that ethnomusicology is a field that intersects in a vast array of other fields in the social sciences and beyond, it focuses on studying people, and it is appropriate to encounter the issue of "making the unfamiliar, familiar," a phrase coined by William McDougall that is well known in social psychology. As in social psychology, the "unfamiliar" is encountered in three different ways during ethnomusicological work: 1) two different cultures come into contact and elements of both are not immediately explicable to the other; 2) experts within a society produce new knowledge, which is then communicated to the public; and 3) active minorities communicate their perspective to the majority.

Nettl has also been vocal about the effect of subjective understanding on research. As he describes, a fieldworker might attempt immersing themselves into an outsider culture to gain full understanding. This, however, can begin to blind the researcher and take away the ability to be objective in what is being studied. The researcher begins to feel like an expert in a culture's music when, in fact, they remain an outsider no matter the amount of research, because they are from a different culture. The background knowledge of each individual influences the focus of the study because of the comfort level with the material. Nettl characterizes the majority of outsiders as "simply members of Western society who study non-Western music, or members of affluent nations who study the music of the poor, or maybe city folk who visit the backward villages in their hinterland." This points to possible Eurocentric origins of researching foreign and exotic music. Within this outsider/insider dynamic and framework unequal power relations come into focus and question.

In addition to his critiques of the outsider and insider labels, Nettl creates a binary that roughly equates to Western and Nonwestern. He points out what he feels are flaws in Western thinking through the analyses of multiple societies, and promotes the notion of collaborating, with a greater focus on acknowledging the contribution of native experts. He writes, "The idea of joint research by an 'insider' and an 'outsider' has been mentioned as a way of bridging the chasms." In spite of his optimism, the actualization of this practice has been limited and the degree to which this can solve the insider/outsider dilemma is questionable. He believes that every concept is studied through a personal perspective, but "a comparison of viewpoints may give the broadest possible insight."

The position of ethnomusicologists as outsiders looking in on a music culture, has been discussed using Said's theory of Orientalism. This manifests itself in the notion that music championed by the field may be, in many ways, a Western construction based on an imagined or romanticized view of "the Other" situated within a colonial mindset. According to Nettl, there are three beliefs of insiders and members of the host culture that emerge that lead to adverse results. The three are as follows: (1) "Ethnomusicologists come to compare non-Western musics or other "other" traditions to their own... in order to show that the outsider's own music is superior," (2)Ethnomusicologists want to use their own approaches to non-Western music;" and (3) "They come with the assumption that there is such a thing as African or Asian or American Indigenous music, disregarding boundaries obvious to the host." As Nettl argues, some of these concerns are no longer valid, as ethnomusicologists no longer practice certain orientalist approaches that homogenize and totalize various musics. He explores further intricacies within the insider/outsider dichotomy by deconstructing the very notion of insider, contemplating what geographic, social, and economic factors distinguish them from outsiders. He notes that scholars of "more industrialized African and Asian nations" see themselves as outsiders in regards to rural societies and communities. Even though these individuals are in the minority, and ethnomusicology and its scholarship is generally written from a western perspective, Nettl disputes the notion of the native as the perpetual other and the outsider as the westerner by default.

Timothy Rice is another author who discusses the insider/outsider debate in detail but through the lens of his own fieldwork in Bulgaria and his experience as an outsider trying to learn Bulgarian music. In his experience, told through his book May it Fill Your Soul: Experiencing Bulgarian Music, he had a difficult time learning Bulgarian music because his musical framework was founded in a Western perspective. He had to "broaden his horizons" and try instead to learn the music from a Bulgarian framework in order to learn to play it sufficiently. Although he did learn to play the music, and the Bulgarian people said that he had learned it quite well, he admitted that "there are still areas of the tradition (...) that elude my understanding and explanation. (...) Some sort of culturally sensitive understanding (...) will be necessary to close this gap."

Ultimately, Rice argues that despite the impossibility of being objective one's work ethnomusicologists may still learn much from self-reflection. In his book, he questions about whether or not one can be objective in understanding and discussing art and, in accordance with the philosophies of phenomenology, argues that there can be no such objectivity since the world is constructed with preexisting symbols that distort any "true" understanding of the world we are born into. He then suggests that no ethnomusicologist can ever come to an objective understanding of a music nor can an ethnomusicologist understand foreign music in the same way that a native would understand it. In other words, an outsider can never become an insider. However, an ethnomusicologist can still come to a subjective understanding of that music, which then shapes that scholar's understanding of the outside world. From his own scholarship, Rice suggests "five principles for the acquisition of cognitive categories in this instrumental tradition" among Bulgarian musicians. However, as an outsider, Rice notes that his "understanding passed through language and verbal cognitive categories" whereas the Bulgarian instrumental tradition lacked "verbal markers and descriptors of melodic form" so "each new student had to generalize and learn on his own the abstract conceptions governing melodies without verbal or visual aids." With these two different methods for learning music, an outsider searching for verbal descriptions versus an insider learning from imitating, represent the essential differences between Rice's culture and the Bulgarian culture. These inherent musical differences blocked him from reaching the role of an insider.

Not only is there the question of being on the outside while studying another culture, but also the question of how to go about studying one's own society. Nettl's approach would be to determine how the culture classifies their own music. He is interested in the categories they would create to classify their own music. In this way, one would be able to distinguish themselves from the outsider while still having slight insider insight. Kingsbury believes it is impossible to study a music outside of one's culture, but what if that culture is your own? One must be aware of the personal bias they may impose on the study of their own culture.

Kingsbury, an American pianist and ethnomusicologist, decided to reverse the common paradigm of a Westerner performing fieldwork in a non-western context, and apply fieldwork techniques to a western subject. In 1988 he published Music, Talent, and Performance: A Conservatory Cultural System, which detailed his time studying an American northeastern conservatory. He approached the conservatory as if it were a foreign land, doing his best to disassociate his experiences and prior knowledge of American conservatory culture from his study. In the book, Kingsbury analyzes conservatory conventions he and his peers may have overlooked, such as the way announcements are disseminated, to make assertions about the conservatory's culture. For example, he concludes that the institutional structure of the conservatory is "strikingly decentralized." In light of professors' absences, he questions the conservatory's commitment to certain classes. His analysis of the conservatory contains four main elements: a high premium on teachers' individuality, teachers' role as nodal points that reinforce a patron-client-like system of social organization, this subsequent organization's enforcement of the aural traditions of musical literacy, and the conflict between this client/patron structure and the school's "bureaucratic administrative structure." Ultimately, it seems, Kingsbury thinks the conservatory system is inherently flawed. He emphasizes that he doesn't intend to "chide" the conservatory, but his critiques are nonetheless far from complimentary.

Another example of western ethnomusicologists studying their native environments comes from Craft's My Music: Explorations of Music in Daily Life. The book contains interviews from dozens of (mostly) Americans of all ages, genders, ethnicities, and backgrounds, who answered questions about the role of music in their lives. Each interviewee had their own unique, necessary, and deeply personal internal organization of their own music. Some cared about genre, others organized the music important to themselves by artist. Some considered music deeply important to them, some did not care about music at all.

Applied Ethnomusicology
Applied ethnomusicology uses music as a device to build bridges and create positive change in the world. “Today applied ethnomusicology is established as one of the strongest branches of ethnomusicology”. Jeff Titon thinks of ethnomusicology as the study of people making music, where applied ethnomusicology is “a music centered intervention into a particular community whose purpose is to benefit that community, for example a social improvement, a musical benefit, a cultural good, or an economic advantage.”   Applied ethnomusicology is people-focused and guided by ethical and humanitarian principles. The first time that the term applied ethnomusicology appeared in an official SEM publication was is 1964 when The Anthropology of Music  Alan Merriam wrote “The ultimate aim of the study of man involves the question of whether one is searching knowledge for its own sake or is attempting to provide solutions for practically applied problems.” The purpose of an applied ethnomusicology is the latter, knowledge for the sake of positive impact on humanitarian issues. Thus, a part of applied ethnomusicology is advocacy as opposed to solely participating as the observer. This includes working with a community to move social initiatives forward, and “acting as an intermediary between cultural insiders and outsiders”. 
	Applied ethnomusicology became widely known in the 1990s but many fieldworkers were practicing it long before the name was established. For example, David McAllester and Bruno Nettl’s fieldwork on Enemy Way music  is very much an example of applied ethnomusicology, where ethical values were closely considered and where the approach itself is comprehensive and designed to share understanding for the betterment of the Navajo nation. Here is an example of how applied ethnomusicology goes further than just considering music’s role within culture, but what music is “conceived to be” within a culture.  Clearly, a crucial part of applied ethnomusicology is fieldwork and the way in which fieldwork is conducted as well as the way the fieldworker speaks on and acts towards the subject matter post-fieldwork. In an interview David McAllester revealed how he saw his role after conducting fieldwork on the Navajo Nation, “ And my experience, once I got among the Navajos, caused me to drop out of anthropology. I dropped the scientific point of view to a large extent, and I became…um, an advocate of the Navajos, rather than an objective viewer. And I was certainly among those in ethnomusicology who began to value the… the views of the people who make the music, more than the value of the trained scholars who were studying it.” This is the essence of applied ethnomusicology, to find a to play in the research you conduct during and after conducting research.

Ethnomusicology and Western music
Early in the history of the field of ethnomusicology, there was debate as to whether ethnomusicological work could be done on the music of Western society, or whether its focus was exclusively toward non-Western music. Some early scholars, such as Mantle Hood, argued that ethnomusicology had two potential focuses: the study of all non-European art music, and the study of the music found in a given geographical area.

However, even as early as the 1960s some ethnomusicologists were proposing that ethnomusicological methods should also be used to examine Western music. For instance, Alan Merriam, in a 1960 article, defines ethnomusicology not as the study of non-Western music, but as the study of music in culture. In doing so he discards some of the 'external' focus proposed by the earlier (and contemporary) ethnomusicologists, who regarded non-Western music as more relevant to the attention of scholars. Moreover, he expands the definition from being centered on music to including the study of culture as well.

Modern ethnomusicologists, for the most part, consider the field to apply to western music as well as non-western. However, ethnomusicology, especially in the earlier years of the field, was still primarily focused on non-western cultures; it is only in recent years that ethnomusicological scholarship involved more diversity with respect to both the cultures being studied and the methods by which these cultures may be studied. Ian Pace has discussed how questions regarding what exactly is within ethnomusicology's purview tend to be political rather than scholarly questions. He also states that biases become readily apparent when examining how ethnomusicologists approach Western vs non-Western music.

Despite the increased acceptance of ethnomusicological examinations of Western music, modern ethnomusicologists still focus overwhelmingly on non-Western music. One of the few major examinations of Western art music from an ethnomusicological focus, as well as one of the earliest, is Henry Kingsbury's book Music, Talent, and Performance. In his book, Kingsbury studies a conservatory in the north-eastern United States. His examination of the conservatory uses many of the traditional fieldwork methods of ethnomusicology; however, Kingsbury was studying a group which he is a member of. Part of his approach was to think of his own culture as primitive and tribal to lend it a sense of 'otherness', upon which much of anthropology's theory is based (Kingsbury cites J.M. Weatherford's ethnography of US Congress as the reason he chose this technique).

Bruno Nettl, when writing about signs and symbols, addressed symbolism in Western music culture. He cites a specific example of a music analyst interpreting music Beethoven in a literal fashion according to various pieces of literature. The analyst assigns direct meanings to motifs and melodies according to the literature. Nettl states that this reveals how members of Western music culture are inclined to view art music as symbolic.

Some ethnomusicological work focuses less on either Western or non-Western music specifically. For example, Martin Stokes' work regarding various aspects of identity addresses many cultures, both Western and non-Western. Stokes wrote about gender as it relates to music in various cultures, including Western, analyzing the fairly common phenomena of musicians seemingly presiding over events that are often related to issues of gender, or how a culture may seek to "desex" musicians as a form of control. The insights that Stokes makes are not exclusive to any culture. Stokes also dedicates much of his writing on identity, nationality, and location to how this manifests in Western music. He notes the presence of Irish music in migrant communities in England and American as a way in which individuals locate themselves in the world.

Because ethnomusicology is not limited to the study of music from non-Western cultures, it has the potential to encompass various approaches to the study of the many musics around the world and emphasize their different contexts and dimensions (cultural, social, material, cognitive, biological, etc.) beyond their isolated sound components. Thus, Western popular music is also subject to ethnomusicological interest. This ethnomusicological work has been called urban ethnomusicology.

Thomas Turino has written about the influence of the media on consumerism in Western society and that it is a bi-directional effect. A large part of self-discovery and feeling accepted in social groups is related to common musical tastes. Record companies and producers of music recognize this reality and respond by catering to specific groups. In the same way that "sounds and imagery piped in over the radio and Internet and in videos shape adolescent sense of gendered selves as well as generational and more specific cohort identities," so do individuals shape the media's marketing responses to musical tastes in Western popular music culture. The culmination of identity groups (teenagers in particular) across the country represents a significant force that can shape the music industry based on what is being consumed.

Ethics
Ethics is vital in the Ethnomusicology field because the product that comes out of fieldwork can be the result of the interaction between two cultures. Applying ethics to this field will confirm that each party is comfortable with the elements in the product and ensure that each party is compensated fairly for their contribution. To learn more about the monetary effects after a work is published, please see the copyright section of this page.

Ethics is defined by Merriam-Webster as, "the principles of conduct governing an individual or a group." In historical primary documents, there are accounts of interactions between two cultures. An example of this is Hernán Cortés' personal journal during his exploration of the world, and his interaction with the Aztecs. He takes note of every interaction as he is a proxy the Spanish monarchy. This interaction was not beneficial to both parties because Cortes as a soldier conquered the Aztecs and seized their wealth, goods, and property in an unjust manner. Historically, interactions between two different cultures have not ended in both parties being uplifted. In fieldwork, the ethnomusicologist travels to a specific country with the intent to learn more about the culture, and while she is there, she will use her ethics to guide her in how she interacts with the indigenous people.

In the Society of Ethnomusicology, there is a committee on ethics that publishes the field's official Position Statement on Ethics. Because ethnomusicology has some fundamental values that stem from anthropology, some of the ethics in ethnomusicology parallel some ethics in anthropology as well. The American Anthropology Association have statements about ethics and anthropological research which can be paralleled to ethnomusicology's statement.

Mark Slobin, a twentieth century ethnomusicologist, observes that discussion on ethics has been founded on several assumptions, namely that: 1) "Ethics is largely an issue for 'Western' scholars working in 'non-Western' societies"; 2) "Most ethical concerns arise from interpersonal relations between scholar and 'informant' as a consequence of fieldwork"; 3) "Ethics is situated within...the declared purpose of the researcher: the increase of knowledge in the ultimate service of human welfare." Which is a reference to Ralph Beals; and 4) "Discussion of ethical issues proceeds from values of Western culture." Slobin remarks that a more accurate statement might acknowledge that ethics vary across nations and cultures, and that the ethics from the cultures of both researcher and informant are in play in fieldwork settings.

Some case scenarios for ethically ambiguous situations that Slobin discusses include the following:

 The discovery of a rare musical instrument leads to the debate of whether it should be preserved in a museum or left in its native culture to be played, but not necessarily preserved.
 The filming of a documentary video brings up the issues of consent from those who are being filmed. Additionally, the film should not necessarily be shown if the producer is not present to answer questions or clarify the video's content if there are questions from the audience.
 Deciding how the monetary gains of a musical production should be distributed is a more prominent case of ethical concern.
 Attaining partial permission in the field is usually not enough to justify filming or recording; every person in the group should consent to the presence of a recording device.
 Whether truthful but possibly condemning information about a group is a situation that should be treated with extreme caution. Any information that could cause trouble for the musicians may need to be censored.
Slobin's discussion of ethical issues in ethnomusicology was surprising in that he highlights the ethnomusicology community's apathy towards the public discussion of ethical issues, as evidenced by the lackluster response of scholars at a large 1970 SEM meeting.

Slobin also points out a facet of ethical thinking among ethnomusicologists in that many of the ethical rules deal with Westerners studying in non-Western, third world countries. Any non-Western ethnomusicologists are immediately excluded from these rules, as are Westerner's studying Western music.

He also highlights several prevalent issues in ethnomusicology by using hypothetical cases from an American Anthropological Association newsletter and framing them in terms of ethnomusicology. For example: "You bring a local musician, one of your informants, to the West on tour. He wants to perform pieces you feel inappropriately represent his tradition to Westerns, as the genre reinforces Western stereotypes about the musician's homeland... do you have the right to overrule the insider when he is on your territory?"

Ethnomusicologists also tend towards the discussion of ethics in sociological contexts. Timothy Taylor writes on the byproducts of cultural appropriation through music, arguing that the 20th century commodification of non-western musics serves to marginalize certain groups of musicians who are not traditionally integrated into the western music production and distribution industries. Slobin also mentions cultural and musical appropriation, noting that there is an ethical concern with musical appropriation being portrayed as appreciation and the “long-term appropriation and profiteering of minority musics by the music industry.” Steven Feld also argues that ethnomusicologists also have their place in analyzing the ethics of popular music collaboration, such as Paul Simon's work with traditional zydeco, Chicano, and South African beats on Graceland. He provides some evidence for Slobin's statement in his article, Notes on World Beat, as he notes that inherently imbalanced power dynamics within musical collaboration can contribute to cultural exploitation. According to Feld’s article, it seems as though the party that is “appreciating” a type of music ultimately reaps more benefits, such as “economic rewards and artistic status,” than the party whose work is appropriated. For example, The Rolling Stones paid homage to Muddy Waters by “utilizing many aspects of [the] original recorded performance style from the 1950’s” and claimed that the cover version brought “free” publicity to the Muddy Waters. However, as Feld mentions, this statement is an arrogant one, since it implies that “it takes a recording by The Rolling Stones to bring recognition to the artistic contributions of a Muddy Waters.” Feld’s question of how to “measure appropriation of original creative product” when there is always a “lesser trickle down of economic payback” remains unanswered. Another ethical issue that Feld brings up is the power dynamics within record companies. The companies themselves make the most money and major contract artists can produce their own work and “tak[e] economic/artistic risks commensurate with their sales.” On the other hand, the musicians, who play the role of “wage laborers” as well as “bearers and developers of musical traditions and idioms,” gain the least and have the most to lose, since they offer their labor and aspects of their culture in the hopes that “royalty percentages, spinoff jobs, tours, and recording contracts might follow from the exposure and success of records.”

When talking about ethics in ethnomusicology it is imperative that I remain specific about who it applies to. An ethnomusicologist must consider ethics if he comes from a culture that is different from the culture that he wants to conduct his research on. An ethnomusicologist that conducts research on a culture that is their own may not have to weigh ethics. For example, music scholar, Kofi Agawu writes about African music and all of its significant aspects. He mentions the dynamics of music among the generations, the significance of the music, and the effects of the music on the society. Agawu highlights that some scholars glaze over the spirit of African music and argues that this is problematic because the spirit is one of the most essential components in the music. Agawu is also a scholar from Africa, more specifically Ghana, so he knows more about the culture because he is a part of that culture. Being a native of the culture that one is studying is beneficial because of the instinctive insight that one has been taught since birth. However, a native fieldworker may experience a slight ethical dilemma as they research their own community, given that there are concerns that “arise from interpersonal relations between scholar and ‘informant’ as a consequence of fieldwork.” According to Clint Bracknell, who studies Aboriginal song traditions of Nyungar and happens to have grown up there as well, Indigenous researchers can “use ethnomusicology as a platform” to “engage with, learn, and invigorate their own regional music traditions, particularly those that are presently endangered and under-researched” in order to “contribute to the diversity of music studied, supported, and sustained worldwide." However, they also risk “expos[ing] the vital organs of their culture” as well as the “outsider” misinterpreting their culture. If the native fieldworker’s community does not want them to reveal or record their cultural practices, the fieldworker experiences the dilemma of how much they can reveal in the face of a “cultural grey out” without crossing the line. The fieldworker must consider whether or not they can maintain the musical diversity worldwide while simultaneously respecting their community's wishes.

Martin Rudoy Scherzinger, another twentieth-century ethnomusicologist, contests the claim that copyright law is inherently conducive to exploitation of non-Westerners by Western musicologists for a variety of reasons some of which he quotes from other esteemed ethnomusicologists: some non-Western pieces are uncopyrightable because they are orally passed down, some "sacred songs are issued forth by ancient spirits or gods" giving them no other to obtain copyright, and the concept of copyright may only be relevant in "commercially oriented societies". Furthermore, the very notion of originality (in the West especially) is a quagmire in and of itself. Scherzinger also brought several issues to the forefront that also arise with metaphysical interpretations of authorial autonomy because of his idea that Western aesthetical interpretation is not different than non-Western interpretation. That is, all music is "for the good of mankind" yet the law treats it differently.

Gender
Gender concerns have more recently risen to prominence in the methodology of ethnomusicology.
Modern researchers often criticize historical works of ethnomusicology as showing gender-biased research and androcentric theoretical models that do not reflect reality. There are many reasons for this issue. Historically, ethnomusicological fieldwork often focused on the musical contributions of men, in line with the underlying assumption that male-dominated musical practices were reflective of musical systems of a society as a whole. Other gender-biased research may have been attributed to the difficulty in acquiring information on female performers without infringing upon cultural norms that may not have accepted or allowed women to perform in public (reflective of social dynamics in societies where men dominate public life and women are mostly confined to the private sphere.). Finally, men have traditionally dominated fieldwork and institutional leadership positions and tended to prioritize the experiences of men in the cultures they studied. With a lack of accessible female informants and alternative forms of collecting and analyzing musical data, ethnomusicological researchers such as Ellen Koskoff believe that we may not be able to fully understand the musical culture of a society. Ellen Koskoff quotes Rayna Reiter, saying that bridging this gap would explain the "seeming contradiction and internal workings of a system for which we have only half the pieces."

Women contributed extensively to ethnomusicological fieldwork from the 1950s onward, but women's and gender studies in ethnomusicology took off in the 1970s. Ellen Koskoff articulates three stages in women's studies within ethnomusicology: first, a corrective approach that filled in the basic gaps in our knowledge of women's contributions to music and culture; second, a discussion of the relationships between women and men as expressed through music; third, integrating the study of sexuality, performance studies, semiotics, and other diverse forms of meaning-making. Since the 1990s, ethnomusicologists have begun to consider the role of the fieldworker's identity, including gender and sexuality, in how they interpret the music of other cultures. Until the emergence of notions like feminist ethnomusicology in late 1980s (which derived its momentum from Third Wave feminism), women within ethnomusicology were limited to serve as interpreters of content created and recorded by men.

Despite the historical trend of overlooking gender, modern ethnomusicologists believe that studying gender can provide a useful lens to understand the musical practices of a society. Considering the divisions of gender roles in society, ethnomusicologist Ellen Koskoff writes: "Many societies similarly divide musical activity into two spheres that are consistent with other symbolic dualisms", including such culture-specific, gender-based dualisms as private/public, feelings/actions, and sordid (provocative)/holy. In some cultures, music comes to reflect those divisions in such a way that women's music and instrumentation is viewed as "non-music" as opposed to men's "music". These and other dualities of musical behavior can help demonstrate societal views of gender, whether the musical behavior supports or subverts gender roles. In her analysis, Koskoff pinpoints a way in which this "symbolic dualism" manifests itself literally: the relationship between the form or shape of one's instrument and the player's gender identity; Koskoff's research demonstrates that often, "the life-giving roles of either sex are seen or reproduced in their shape or playing motion." Moving outside the analytical scope of gender and adopting a more intersectional lens, Koskoff also remarks on how female musical behavior is affiliated with heightened sexuality, with numerous different cultures holding similar yet unique criteria of eroticized dance movements (e.g. "among the Swahili...all-female gathering where young women do hip-rotations to learn the 'right' sexual movements). It is here where Koskoff integrates notions of the private vs. public sphere, examining how in certain cultures, female musical performance is not only linked to notions of heightened female sexuality, it is also associated with "implied or real prostitution," thus insinuating a potential class hierarchy differentiating the society subcultures surrounding private vs. public female musical performance.

The tendency for public music performed by single women of child-bearing age to be associated with sex, while performances by older or married women tends to downplay or even deny their sexuality, suggests not only that music performance is linked to societal perception of a woman’s sexual viability decreasing with age or marriage, but also that female sexuality is often necessarily included in the expression of a feminine gender through musical performance. The cloistering and separation of women’s music actually offer a way for women to relate to one another or to understand and express their gender identity through musical practice within a more women-centric space. The private, intimate nature of some women’s music can also lead to secret protest behavior when that music is brought into the public sphere. Koskoff indicates that secret symbolic behavior and language coded into women’s performance may communicate private messages to other women in the community, allowing these performers to speak out against an unwanted marriage, mock a possible suitor, or even express homosexuality without the male audience catching on. As such, music performance may confirm and maintain these gender inequalities and social/sexual dynamics, may protest norms as it maintains them, or it may actually challenge and threaten the established order. One example of musical performance traditions that confirm social/sexual dynamics may be the trend of prioritizing a female musician’s physical appeal over her technical musical skill when judging her performance, which shows a devaluation of female musical expression in favor of objectification of the feminine physicality through the public gaze. Koskoff recalls that women musicians who do manage to become popular in mainstream culture may start to take on masculine-coded musical qualities, even if it was their expression of femininity through performance that initially elicited their acclaim.

Since Koskoff’s book was published, contemporary ethnomusicologists have continued to study the practices and dynamics she cites in more detail. In “Sounds of Power: An Overview of Musical Instruments and Gender”, Veronica Doubleday extends the examination of feminine gender expression in music performance to the use of specific musical instruments. She reiterates that in patriarchal societies, the role of a man in a marriage tends to be one of ownership and control, while a married woman often takes on a position of submission and subordination. As such, Doubleday suggests that when constructing a relationship with their instruments, men may incorporate their cultural expectation of dominance, whereas women may be unlikely to take power over an instrument in the same way. If the physical allure of a female musician takes priority over her technique, female gender expression through music performance may be confined to that which upholds traditional notions of female beauty and objectification. Doubleday relates this to the distinction of “suitable” instruments for women as those that require no physical exertions that may disrupt the graceful portrait of the woman, or instruments that take an accompaniment role to the performer’s singing.
Exploring more modern musical traditions, ethnomusicologist Gibb Schreffler recounts the role of Punjabi women in music in the context of migration in “Migration Shaping Media: Punjabi Popular Music in a Global Historical Perspective”. As women are often the bearers of tradition in Punjabi culture, they hold important roles in many traditional Punjabi rituals, including those that involve music, which help enable emigrants to maintain Punjabi culture wherever they are. Schreffler also notes that as a result of migration, bhangra music has enabled the reformation of traditional gender roles in the public sphere through the performance of music: “In creating a ‘dance floor,’ women were allowed to mingle with men in ways they had not done before”.

Similarly, in “Music and the Negotiation of Orthodox Jewish Gender Roles in Partnership ‘Minyanim’”, a study of gender dynamics within Orthodox Jewish culture as disrupted by minyanim partner dance, Dr. Gordon Dale documents how partnership minyanim dance may actively reinterpret Orthodox Jewish religious law in establishing a new context for women's performance. The grounding of a new female music performance tradition in religion is particularly noteworthy considering the ways in which women are often excluded from religious music, both in the Orthodox Jewish consideration of female singing as inappropriate or weaponized sexual behavior that conflicts with expectations of modesty, and across diverse cultural spheres, as shown in Hagedorn’s example of the batá drum. In this instance, feminine musical expression becomes a highly political issue, with right-wing Orthodox men insisting it was impossible for a man to hear a woman singing without experiencing it as a sexual act, and male partnership minyan participants concluding instead that certain considerations of modesty were not applicable in the context of their prayer. Therefore, a woman’s singing voice could also be considered a sound of gender liberation against Orthodox power structures. Dale explains that while religious women's music initiatives from other cultures such as Indonesian women chanting from the Qur’an as described by Anne Rasmussen, this type of partnership mynamin requires Orthodoxy to actually create a new religious space in which “men and women can express their religious and feminist values side by side”. Though restrictions on the availability of female roles in worship mean that minyamin must focus more on gender-based partnership than on explicit equality, partnership minyamin still forge a unique musical prayer space in Jewish culture that listens to and encourages women’s voices. He describes one interaction with an older woman who was personally uncomfortable leading religious worship, but greatly appreciated observing other women in that role. Simply singing alongside women in an unrestrained manner served as a comfortable and fulfilling way for her to practice feminism.

There is much room for additional study on the expression of gender through musical performance, including the ways that musical performance can disrupt binary delineations of gender identity and promote the expression of transgender and/or non-binary genders. Koskoff briefly acknowledges that it is possible for performers to “cross over into opposite gender domains, displaying behaviors normally associated with the opposite sex”, which has greater implications for the way that music performance enables the performance of gender identity.

As a result of these new considerations from within the field, efforts to better document and preserve women's contributions to ethnomusicology have increased. With a particular focus on collecting ethnomusicological works (as well as literature from related fields) that address gender inequities within musical performance as well as musical analysis, feminist musicologists Bowers and Bareis published the Biography on Music and Gender – Women in Music, which is arguably the most comprehensive collection compiling ethnomusicological literature meeting this analytical criteria. Although it is not an ethnomusicological book, another Susan McClary's watershed book Feminine Endings (1991) shows "relationships between musical structure and socio-cultural values" and has influenced ethnomusicologists perception of gender and sexuality within the discipline itself. There is a general understanding that Western conceptions of gender, sexuality, and other social constructions do not necessarily apply to other cultures and that a predominantly Western lens can cause various methodological issues for researchers.

For example, Katherine Hagedorn uses this technique in Divine Utterances: The Performance of Afro-Cuban Santeria. Throughout her description of her fieldwork in Cuba, Hagedorn remarks how her positionality, through her whiteness, femaleness, and foreignness, afforded her luxuries out of reach of her Cuban counterparts, and how the magnitude of difference in her experience and existence in Cuba was exacerbated by Cuba's economic turmoil after the fall of the Soviet Union during the Cuban Revolution. Her positionality also put her in an "outsider" perspective on Cuban culture and affected her ability to access the culture as a researcher on Santeria. Her whiteness and foreignness, she writes, allowed her to circumvent intimate inter-gender relations centered around performance using the bata drum. Unlike her Cuban female counterparts who faced stigma, she was able to learn to play the bata and thus formulate her research.

Today, the society for ethnomusicology is actively dedicating itself to increasing the presence and stature of gender/sexuality/LGBTQ/feminist scholarship within our respective music societies through forums like The Gender and Sexualities Taskforce within the society for ethnomusicology. The society for ethnomusicology has additionally established awards to celebrate work and research conducted within this intersectional subfield of ethnomusicology. Specifically, the society of ethnomusicology developed the Marcia Herndon Prize, which was created to honor exceptional ethnomusicological work in gender and sexuality including, but not limited to, works that focus upon lesbian, gay, bisexual, two-spirited, homosexual, transgendered and multiple gender issues and communities, as well as to commemorate the deeply influential contributions of Herndon to the field in these arenas. Specifically, Herndon is championed for co-editing Music, Gender, and Culture, a collection of fifteen essays (all authored by women) inspired by the Heidelberg meeting of the Music and Gender Study Group of the International Council for Traditional Music, making key comparisons between the philosophies and behaviors between male and female ethnomusicologists and musicians. This work has prompted a great deal of dialogue among ethnomusicologists and scholars of related fields, including Virginia Giglio, Ph.D., who reviewed Herndon's seminal work, identifying central themes of spirituality, female empowerment, and culturally-defined gender-related duties as specific areas for further exploration among modern feminist ethnomusicologists

Mass media
In the first chapter of his book Popular Music of the Non-Western World, Peter Manual examines the effect technology has had on non-western music by discussing its ability to disseminate, change, and influence music around the world. He begins with a discussion about definitions of genres, highlighting the difficulties in distinguishing between folk, classical, and popular music, within any one society. By tracing the historical development of the phonograph, radio, cassette recordings, and television, Manuel shows that, following the practice set in the western world, music has become a commodity in many societies, that it no longer has the same capacity to unite a community, to offer a kind of "mass catharsis" as one scholar put it. He stresses that any modern theoretical lens from which to view music must account for the advent of technology.

Martin Stokes uses his book Ethnicity, Identity and Music to examine how the presence of records, tapes, and CD's, and the ability to listen to music removed from its social setting affects identity and social boundaries. Stokes mentions how modernity and new technology has created a separation between place or "locale" (referring to the physical setting of social activity as situated geographically) and space (the location from where the music is being played and listened to.) Stokes calls the separation from space and place, "relocation" and refers to it as an "anxiety ridden process." Stokes believes that music plays an essential role to how individuals "relocate" themselves, claiming that music is unmatched by any other social activity in its ability to evoke and organize collective memory. Stokes also claims that the presence of records, tapes and CD's creates the ability to present experiences of specific places "with an intensity and power and simplicity unmatched." Stokes also touches upon the differences and social boundaries that each "place" holds. Claiming that each "place" organizes "hierarchies of moral and political order" and with each specific evocation of "place," defines the moral and political community to relation to the space in which the listener finds themselves. The possibility of the instant evocation of musical "place" allows individuals to "locate," and identify themselves in a plurality of ways, allowing a unique mix of places and social boundaries. Stokes also goes on to mention how the control of media systems by state-controlled governments, through ownership of its channels is a tool which authoritarian states use. Such control is not certain, as the meanings cannot be totally controlled and the citizens of said state can simply turn off the radio state or tune into another. Stokes believes the technological advancements in sound reproduction has democratized recording and listening, and thus, "weakened the grip of state and music industry monopolies."

The book Music and Technocultures by René T. Lysloff and Leslie C. Gay Jr. speaks upon the nature of the rise of technology. They believe that as technology increases, as does its social consequences. Such technologies do not change the social configurations which existed before new technologies, but instead the people that engage with and use these technologies change, instead. Lysloff and Gay use the emergence of the use of MP3s as an example. The MP3 file format can be combined with other software's to give tools that link online communities of music consumers with vast databases of music files, which individuals then have easy access to gigabytes of digital information. The existence of MP3s and these software's then allows for the new possibilities for the exchange of music and gives greater control to the selection of music to the end user, undermining the power of the popular music industries. Such technologies also allow unsigned artists to distribute their own recordings on an unthinkable scale. Later within the book Gay and Lysloff go on to speak on the effects of technological control on consumer practices. Gay and Lysloff go on to say that "Popular music musicians today are shaped first as 'consumers of technology,' in which musical practices align with consumer practices. Even within the "architectonic" structure of malls and acoustic spaces, they are built to connect with consumer practices, defining territory and motivating shoppers.

Copyright
Copyright is defined as "the exclusive right to make copies, license, and otherwise exploit a literary, musical, or artistic work, whether printed, audio, video, etc." It is imperative because copyright is what dictates where credit and monetary awards should be allocated. While ethnomusicologists conduct fieldwork, they sometimes must interact with the indigenous people. Additionally, since the purpose of the ethnomusicologists being in a particular country is so that she can collect information to make conclusions. The researchers leave their countries of interest with interviews, videos, text, along with multiple other sources of valuable. Rights surrounding music ownership are thus often left to ethics.

The specific issue with copyright and ethnomusicology is that copyright is an American right; however, some ethnomusicologists conduct research in countries that are outside of the United States. For example, Anthony Seeger details his experience while working with the Suyá people of Brazil and the release of their song recordings. The Suyá people have practices and beliefs about inspiration and authorship, where the ownership roots from the animals, spirits, and "owned" by entire communities. In the American copyright laws, they ask for a single original author, not groups of people, animals, or spirits. Situations like Seeger's then result in the indigenous people not being given credit or sometime into being able to have access to the monetary wealth that may come along with the published goods. Seeger also mentions that in some cases, copyright will be granted, but the informant-performer, the researcher, the producer, and the organization funding the research –earns the credit that the indigenous people deserve." "

Martin Scherzinger mentions how copyright is dealt with in the Senegal region of Africa. The copyright benefits, such as royalties, from music are allocated to the Senegalese government, and then the government in turn hosts a talent competition, where the winner receives the royalties. Scherzinger offers a differing opinion on copyright, and argues that the law is not inherently ethnocentric. He cites the early ideology behind copyright in the 19th century, stating that spiritual inspiration did not prohibit composers from being granted authorship of their works. Furthermore, he suggests that group ownership of a song is not significantly different from the collective influence in Western classical music of several composers on any individual work.

A solution to some of the copyright issue that the ethnomusicology is having is to push for the broadening of the copyright laws in the United States. To broaden is equivalent to changing who can be cited as the original author of a piece of work to include the values that specific societies have. In order for this to be done, ethnomusicologists have to find a common ground amongst the copyright issues that they have encountered collectively.

Identity
The origins of music and its connections to identity have been debated throughout the history of ethnomusicology. Thomas Turino defines "self," "identity," and "culture" as patterns of habits, such that tendencies to respond to stimuli in particular ways repeat and reinscribe themselves. Musical habits and our responses to them lead to cultural formations of identity and identity groups. For Martin Stokes, the function of music is to exercise collective power, creating barriers among groups. Thus, identity categories such as ethnicity and nationality are used to indicate oppositional content.

Just as music reinforces categories of self-identification, identity can shape musical innovation. George Lipsitz's 1986 case study of Mexican-American music in Los Angeles from the 1950s to the 1980s posits that Chicano musicians were motivated to integrate multiple styles and genres in their music to represent their multifaceted cultural identity. By incorporating Mexican folk music and modern-day barrio influences, Mexican rock-and-roll musicians in LA made commercially successful postmodern records that included content about their community, history, and identity. Lipsitz suggests that the Mexican community in Los Angeles reoriented their traditions to fit the postmodern present. Seeking a "unity of disunity", minority groups can attempt to find solidarity by presenting themselves as sharing experience with other oppressed groups. According to Lipsitz, this disunity creates a disunity that furthermore engenders a "historical bloc," made up of numerous, multifaceted, marginalized cultures.

Lipsitz noted the bifocal nature of the rock group Los Lobos is particularly exemplary of this paradox. They straddled the line by mixing traditional Mexican folk elements with white rockabilly and African American rhythm and blues, while simultaneously conforming to none of the aforementioned genres. That they were commercially successful was unsurprising to Lipsitz- their goal in incorporating many cultural elements equally was to play to everyone. In this manner, in Lipsitz's view, the music served to break down barriers in its up front presentation of "multiple realities".

Lipsitz describes the weakening effect that the dominant (Los Angeles) culture imposes on marginalized identities. He suggests that the mass media dilutes minority culture by representing the dominant culture as the most natural and normal. Lipsitz also proposes that capitalism turns historical traditions of minority groups into superficial icons and images in order to profit on their perception as "exotic" or different. Therefore, the commodification of these icons and images results in the loss of their original meaning.

Minorities, according to Lipsitz, cannot fully assimilate nor can they completely separate themselves from dominant groups. Their cultural marginality and misrepresentation in the media makes them aware of society's skewed perception of them. Antonio Gramsci suggests that there are "experts in legitimization", who attempt to legitimize dominant culture by making it look like it is consented by the people who live under it. He also proposes that the oppressed groups have their own "organic intellectuals" who provide counter-oppressive imagery to resist this legitimization. For example, Low riders used irony to poke fun at popular culture's perception of desirable vehicles, and bands like Los Illegals provided their listening communities with a useful vocabulary to talk about oppression and injustice.

Michael M.J. Fisher breaks down the following main components of postmodern sensibility: "bifocality or reciprocity of perspectives, juxtaposition of multiple realities-intertextuality, inter-referentiality, and comparisons through families of resemblance." A reciprocity of perspectives makes music accessible inside and outside of a specific community. Chicano musicians exemplified this and juxtaposed multiple realities by combining different genres, styles, and languages in their music. This can widen the music's reception by allowing it to mesh within its cultural setting, while incorporating Mexican history and tradition. Inter-referentiality, or referencing relatable experiences, can further widen the music's demographic and help to shape its creators' cultural identities. In doing so, Chicano artists were able to connect their music to "community subcultures and institutions oriented around speech, dress, car customizing, art, theater, and politics." Finally, drawing comparisons through families of resemblance can highlight similarities between cultural styles. Chicano musicians were able to incorporate elements of R&B, Soul, and Rock n' Roll in their music.

Music is not only used to create group identities, but to develop personal identity as well. Frith describes music's ability to manipulate moods and organize daily life. Susan Crafts studied the role of music in individual life by interviewing a wide variety of people, from a young adult who integrated music in every aspect of her life to a veteran who used music as a way to escape his memories of war and share joy with others. Many scholars have commented on the associations that individuals develop of "my music" versus "your music": one's personal taste contributes to a sense of unique self-identity reinforced through the practices of listening to and performing certain music.

As part of a broader inclusion of identity politics (see Gender), ethnomusicologists have become increasingly interested in how identity shapes ethnomusicological work. Fieldworkers have begun to consider their positions within race, economic class, gender, and other identity categories and how they relate to or differ from cultural norms in the areas they study. Katherine Hagedorn's 2001 Book Divine Utterances: The Performance of Afro-Cuban Santería is an example of experiential ethnomusicology, which "...incorporates the author's voice, interpretations, and reactions into the ethnography, musical and cultural analysis, and historical context." The book received the Society for Ethnomusicology's prestigious Alan P. Merriam prize in 2002, marking a broad acceptance of this new method in the institutions of ethnomusicology.

Nationalism

Ethnomusicological inquiries frequently involve a focus on the relationship between music and nationalist movements across the world, necessarily following the emergence of the modern nation-state as a consequence of globalization and its associated ideals, in contrast to a pre-imperialist world ,

In the latter half of the 19th century, song collectors motivated by the legacy of folkloric studies and musical nationalism in Southern and Eastern Europe collected folk songs for use in the construction of a pan-Slavic identity. Collector-composers became "national composers" when they composed songs that became emblematic of a national identity. Namely, Frederic Chopin gained international recognition as a composer of emblematic Polish music despite having no ancestral ties to the Polish peasantry Other composers such as Béla Bartók, Jean Sibelius, Edvard Grieg, and Nikolai Rimsky Korsakov utilized as well as contributed to the growing archives of recorded European folk songs to compose songs for the benefit of the nationalist governments of their respective countries. The French musicologist Radolphe d'Erlanger undertook a project of reviving older musical forms in Tunisia in order to reconstruct "Oriental music," playing on instruments such as the ud and ghazal. Performing ensembles using such instruments were featured at the 1932 Congress of Arab Music in Cairo.

Globalization
Towards the end of the 20th century, the field of ethnomusicology had blossomed in American academia. With racial and ethnic demographics evolving rapidly in institutions around the country, the demand for a new type of curricula that focused on teaching students about cultural differences only grew stronger. Incorporating ethnomusicology into the American curriculum allows for students to explore other cultures, and it provides an open space for students with varying cultural backgrounds. Thankfully, recordings of music from around the world began to enter the Euro-American music industry because of the advancements made in technology and musical devices. In addition to these advancements, many scholars were receiving funding in order to go abroad and perform research following the end of the Cold War. This type of research allowed scholars to learn firsthand about cultures they aren't familiar with—including hearing testimonies about customs, observing social and cultural norms, and learning how to play the instruments from a culture.

Timothy Taylor discusses the arrival and development of new terminology in the face of globalization. The term "World Music" was developed and popularized as a way to categorize and sell "non-Western" music. The term "world music" began in the 1990s as a marketing term to classify and sell records from other parts of the world under a unified label. Different styles of this world music began making appearances on the Billboard charts, in Grammy Award nominations, and through participation of new immigrants looking to get involved as musicians and audience members. The Billboard Charts and the Grammy's came to be used as became a great indicator for trends happening in music and to let people know who and what is selling. The Billboard music charts can be thought of as a marker of day-to-day activities of the music industry, and the Grammy awards can be thought of as an indicator of what sells and excels. The term "world beat" was also employed in the 90s to refer specifically to pop music, but it has fallen out of use. The issue that these terms present is that they perpetuate an "us" vs. "them" dichotomy, effectively "othering" and combining musical categories outside of the Western tradition for the sake of marketing.

Turino proposes the use of the term "cosmopolitanism" rather than "globalization" to refer to contact between world musical cultures, since this term suggests a more equitable sharing of music traditions and acknowledges that multiple cultures can productively share influence and ownership of particular musical styles. Another relevant concept is glocalization, and a typology for how this phenomenon impacts music (called "Glocal BAG model") is proposed in the book Music Glocalization.

The issue of appropriation has come to the forefront in discussions of music's globalization, since many Western European and North American artists have participated in "revitalization through appropriation," claiming sounds and techniques from other cultures as their own and adding them to their work without properly crediting the origins of this music. Steven Feld explores this issue further, putting it in the context of colonialism: admiration alone of another culture's music does not constitute appropriation, but in combination with power and domination (economic or otherwise), insufficient value is placed on the music's origin and appropriation has taken place. If the originators of a piece of music are given due credit and recognition, this problem can be avoided.

Feld criticizes the claim to ownership of appropriated music through his examination of Paul Simon's collaboration with South African musicians during the recording of his Graceland album. Simon paid the South African musicians for their work, but he was given all of the legal rights to the music. Although it was characterized by what seems to be fair compensation and mutual respect, Feld suggests that Simon shouldn't be able to claim complete ownership of the music. Feld holds the music industry accountable for this phenomenon, because the system gives legal and artistic credit to major contract artists, who hire musicians like "wage laborers" due to how little they were paid or credit they were given. This system rewards the creativity of bringing the musical components of a song together, rather than rewarding the actual creators of the music. As globalization continues, this system allows capitalist cultures to absorb and appropriate other musical cultures while receiving full credit for its musical arrangement.

Feld also discusses the subjective nature of appropriation, and how society's evaluation of each case determines the severity of the offense. When American singer James Brown borrowed African rhythms, and when the African musician Fela Kuti borrowed elements of style from James Brown, their common roots of culture made the connection more acceptable to society. However, when the Talking Heads borrow style from James Brown, the distancing between the artist and the appropriated music is more overt to the public eye, and the instance becomes more controversial from an ethical standpoint. Thus, the issue of cycling Afro-Americanization and Africanization in Afro-American/African musical material and ideas is embedded in "power and control because of the nature of record companies and their cultivation of an international pop music elite with the power to sell enormous numbers of recordings."

Dr. Gibb Schreffler also examines globalization and diaspora through the lens of Punjabi pop music. Schreffler's writing on bhangra music is a commentary on the dissemination of music and its physical movement. As he suggests, the function and reception of Punjabi music changed drastically as increasing migration and globalization catalyzed the need for a cohesive Punjabi identity, emerging "as a stopgap during a period that was marked by the combination of large-scale experiences of separation from the homeland with as yet poor communication channels." In the 1930s, before liberation from British colonial rule, music that carried the explicit "Punjabi" label primarily had the function of regional entertainment. In contrast, Punjabi music of the 1940s and 50s coincided with a wave of Punjabi nationalism that replaced regionalist ideals of earlier times. The music began to form a particular genteel identity in the 1960s that was accessible even to Punjabi expatriates.

During the 1970s and 80s, Punjabi pop music began to adhere aesthetically to more cosmopolitan tastes, often overshadowing music that reflected a truly authentic Punjabi identity. Soon after, the geographic and cultural locality of Punjabi pop became a prevalent theme, reflecting a strong relationship to the globalization of widespread preferences. Schreffler explains this shift in the role of Punjabi pop in terms of different worlds of performance: amateur, professional, sacred, art, and mediated. These worlds are primarily defined by the act and function of the musical act, and each is a type of marked activity that influences how the musical act is perceived and the social norms and restrictions to which it is subject. Punjabi popular music falls into the mediated world due to globalization and the dissemination of commercial music separating performance from its immediate context. Thus, Punjabi popular music eventually "evolved to neatly represent certain dualities that are considered to characterize Punjabi identity: East/West, guardians of tradition/embracers of new technology, local/diaspora."

In some instances, different groups of people in a culture rely on the globalization of music as a way to sustain themselves and their own culture. For example, author, scholar, and professor in the Department of Black Studies at the University of California, Santa Barbara, George Lipsitz analyzes how the fusion of global cultures play out on American soil through his study of Mexican American culture in Los Angeles. Lipsitz unpacks a lot of cultural issues found within the Mexican American communities during the late 1900s by answering a question Octavio Paz poses on the whereabouts of the Los Angeles Mexican culture. Octavio Paz, a Mexican poet and diplomat, once visited Los Angeles and noted that the culture of Mexico seems to float around the city. The culture never quite exists nor does it seem to vanish. Some of the manifestations of the Mexican-American culture in Los Angeles can be found in what Lipsitz called a "historical bloc". This historical bloc refers to a group of different affinity groups that relate to each other through "counter-hegemonic". The groups bond over their bifocal existence in between spaces, their juxtaposition of multiple realities, and their families of resemblance.

Particularly in Chicano music, the musicians in this culture were strongly encouraged to take on an identity separate from themselves, if they wanted to achieve success in the world. Success might look different depending on the artists. One form of success might be selling tons of record while another form of success might be receiving respect from Anglo-American as real contributors to the "masterpieces" of music. This was definitely not an easy task to achieve, and often required some extra work. For example, Lipsitz writes about the first successful Los Angeles Chicano rock-and-roll songs and what the band members had to do to in order to achieve. The Don Tostino's Band reflected one how difficult it was for them to present Chicano music while not losing their identity. A band member stated that they wanted to play Chicano music instead of looking like clowns. This was a response to their audience's initial expectation that the band would arrive on stage in sombreros, tropical outfits, and other stereotypes attributed to Chicano people.

Another example of globalization in music concerns cases of traditions that are officially recognized by UNESCO, or promoted by national governments, as cases of notable global heritage. In this way, local traditions are introduced to a global audience as something that is so important as to both represent a nation and be of relevance to all people everywhere.

Cognition

Cognitive psychology, neuroscience, anatomy, and similar fields have endeavored to understand how music relates to an individual's perception, cognition, and behavior. Research topics include pitch perception, representation and expectation, timbre perception, rhythmic processing, event hierarchies and reductions, musical performance and ability, musical universals, musical origins, music development, cross-cultural cognition, evolution, and more.

From the cognitive perspective, the brain perceives auditory stimuli as music according to gestalt principles, or "principles of grouping." Gestalt principles include proximity, similarity, closure, and continuation. Each of the gestalt principles illustrates a different element of auditory stimuli that cause them to be perceived as a group, or as one unit of music. Proximity dictates that auditory stimuli that are near to each other are seen as a group. Similarity dictates that when multiple auditory stimuli are present, the similar stimuli are perceived as a group. Closure is the tendency to perceive an incomplete auditory pattern as a whole—the brain "fills in" the gap. And continuation dictates that auditory stimuli are more likely to be perceived as a group when they follow a continuous, detectable pattern.

The perception of music has a quickly growing body of literature. Structurally, the auditory system is able to distinguish different pitches (sound waves of varying frequency) via the complementary vibrating of the eardrum. It can also parse incoming sound signals via pattern recognition mechanisms. Cognitively, the brain is often constructionist when it comes to pitch. If one removes the fundamental pitch from a harmonic spectrum, the brain can still "hear" that missing fundamental and identify it through an attempt to reconstruct a coherent harmonic spectrum.

Research suggests that much more is learned perception, however. Contrary to popular belief, absolute pitch is learned at a critical age, or for a familiar timbre only. Debate still occurs over whether Western chords are naturally consonant or dissonant, or whether that ascription is learned. Relation of pitch to frequency is a universal phenomenon, but scale construction is culturally specific. Training in a cultural scale results in melodic and harmonic expectations.

Cornelia Fales has explored the ways that expectations of timbre are learned based on past correlations. She has offered three main characteristics of timbre: timbre constitutes a link to the external world, it functions as perceptualization's primary instrument and it is a musical element that we experience without informational consciousness. Fales has gone into in-depth exploration of humankind's perceptual relation to timbre, noting that out of all of the musical elements, our perception of timbre is the most divergent from the physical acoustic signal of the sound itself. Growing from this concept, she also discusses the "paradox of timbre", the idea that perceived timbre exists only in the mind of the listener and not in the objective world. In Fales' exploration of timbre, she discusses three broad categories of timbre manipulation in musical performance throughout the world. The first of these, timbral anomaly by extraction, involves the breaking of acoustic elements from the perceptual fusion of timbre of which they were part, leading to a splintering of the perceived acoustic signal (demonstrated in overtone singing and didjeridoo music). The second, timbral anomaly by redistribution, is a redistribution of gestalt components to new groups, creating a "chimeric" sound composed of precepts made up of components from several sources (as seen in Ghanaian balafon music or the bell tone in barbershop singing). Finally, timbral juxtaposition consists of juxtaposing sounds that fall on opposing ends of a continuum of timbral structure that extends from harmonically based to formant-structured timbres (as demonstrated again in overtone singing or the use of the "minde" ornament in Indian sitar music). Overall, these three techniques form a scale of progressively more effective control of perceptualization as reliance on the acoustic world increases. In Fales' examinations of these types of timbre manipulation within Inanga and Kubandwa songs, she synthesizes her scientific research on the subjective/objective dichotomy of timbre with culture-specific phenomena, such as the interactions between music (the known world) and spiritual communication (the unknown world).

Cognitive research has also been applied to ethnomusicological studies of rhythm. Some ethnomusicologists believe that African and Western rhythms are organized differently. Western rhythms may be based on ratio relationships, while African rhythms may be organized additively. In this view, that means that Western rhythms are hierarchical in nature, while African rhythms are serial. One study that provides empirical support for this view was published by Magill and Pressing in 1997. The researchers recruited a highly experienced drummer who produced prototypical rhythmic patterns. Magill and Pressing then used Wing & Kristofferson's (1973) mathematical modeling to test different hypotheses on the timing of the drummer. One version of the model used a metrical structure; however, the authors found that this structure was not necessary. All drumming patterns could be interpreted within an additive structure, supporting the idea of a universal ametrical organization scheme for rhythm.

Researchers have also attempted to use psychological and biological principles to understand more complex musical phenomena such as performance behavior or the evolution of music, but have reached few consensuses in these areas. It is generally accepted that errors in performance give insight into perception of a music's structure, but these studies are restricted to Western score-reading tradition thus far. Currently there are several theories to explain the evolution of music. One of theories, expanded on by Ian Cross, is the idea that music piggy-backed on the ability to produce language and evolved to enable and promote social interaction. Cross bases his account on the fact that music is a humanly ancient art seen throughout nearly every example of human culture. Since opinions vary on what precisely can be defined as "music", Cross defines it as "complexly structured, affectively significant, attentionally entraining, and immediately—yet indeterminately—meaningful," noting that all known cultures have some art form that can be defined in this way. In the same article, Cross examines the communicative power of music, exploring its role in minimizing within-group conflict and bringing social groups together and claiming that music could have served the function of managing intra and inter-group interactions throughout the course of human evolution. Essentially, Cross proposes that music and language evolved together, serving contrasting functions that have been equally essential to the evolution of humankind. Additionally, Bruno Nettl has proposed that music evolved to increase efficiency of vocal communication over long distances, or enabled communication with the supernatural.

Decolonizing Ethnomusicology
The idea of decolonization is not new to the field of ethnomusicology. As early as 2006, the idea became a central topic of discussion for the Society for Ethnomusicology. In humanities and education studies, the term decolonization is used to describe "an array of processes involving social justice, resistance, sustainability, and preservation. However, in ethnomusicology, decolonization is considered to be a metaphor by some scholars. Linda Tuhiwai Smith, a professor of indigenous studies in New Zealand, offered a look into the shift decolonization has taken: "decolonization, once viewed as the formal process of handing over the instruments of government, is now recognized as a long-term process involving the bureaucratic, cultural, linguistic and psychological divesting of colonial power." For ethnomusicology, this shift means that fundamental changes in power structures, worldviews, academia, and the university system need to be analyzed as a confrontation of colonialism. A proposed decolonized approach to ethnomusicology involves reflecting on the philosophies and methodologies that constitute the discipline.

The decolonization of ethnomusicology takes multiple paths. These proposed approaches are: i) ethnomusicologists addressing their roles as scholars, ii) the university system being analyzed and revised, iii) the philosophies, and thus practices, as a discipline being changed. The Fall/Winter 2016 issue of the Society of Ethnomusicology's Student News contains a survey about decolonizing ethnomusicology to see their readers' views on what decolonizing ethnomusicology entailed. The different themes were: i) decentering ethnomusicology from the United States and Europe, ii) expanding/transforming the discipline, iii) recognizing privilege and power, and iv) constructing spaces to actually talk about decolonizing ethnomusicology among peers and colleagues.

One of the issues proposed by Brendan Kibbee for "decolonizing" ethnomusicology is how scholars might reorganize the disciplinary practices to broaden the base of ideas and thinkers. One idea posed is that the preference and privilege of the written word more than other forms of media scholarship hinders a great deal of potential contributors from finding a space in the disciplinary sphere. The possible influence of the Western bias against listening as an intellectual practice could be a reason for a lack of diversity of opinion and background within the field. The colonial aspect comes from the European prejudices regarding subjects' intellectual abilities derived from the Kantian belief that the act of listening being seen as a "danger to the autonomy of the enlightened liberal subject." As colonists reorganized the economic global order, they also created a system that tied social mobility to the ability to assimilate European schooling, forming a meritocracy of sorts. Many barriers keep "postcolonial" voices out of the academic sphere such as the inability to recognize intellectual depth in local practices of knowledge production and transmission. If ethnomusicologists start to rethink the ways in which they communicate with one another, the sphere of academia could be opened to include more than just the written word, allowing new voices to participate.

Another topic of discussion for decolonizing ethnomusicology is the existence of archives as a legacy of colonial ethnomusicology or a model for digital democracy. Comparative musicologists used archives such as the Berlin Phonogramm-Archiv to compare the musics of the world. The current functions of such public archives within institutions and on the internet has been analyzed by ethnomusicologists. Activists and ethnomusicologists working with archives of recorded sound, like Aaron Fox, associate professor at Columbia University, have undertaken recovery and repatriation projects as an attempt at decolonizing the field. Another ethnomusicologist who has developed major music repatriation projects is Diane Thram, who works with the International Library of African Music. Similar work has been dedicated towards film and field video.

Ethnicity
Giving a strict definition to ethnicity is considered difficult by many scholars, but it can be best understood in terms of the creation and preservation of boundaries, in contrast to the social "essences" in the gaps between these boundaries. In fact, ethnic boundaries can both define and maintain social identities, and music can be used in local social situations by members of society to create such boundaries. The idea of authenticity becomes relevant here, where authenticity is not a property of the music or performance itself, but is a way of telling both insiders and outsiders that this is the music that makes one's society unique. Authenticity can also be seen as the idea that a certain music is inextricably bound to a certain group or physical place. It can give insight into the question of the "origin" of music, in that it by definition bears connection to the geographical, historical, and cultural aspects of music. For instance, holding that particular aspects of African-American music are actually fundamentally African is critical to claims of authenticity in the global African diaspora. In terms of how authenticity can be connected to the concept of place, consider the concept of authenticity in Jewish music throughout the Jewish diaspora. "Jewish" music is bound to both the Land of Israel and the ancient Temple of Jerusalem.

Although groups are self-defining in how they express the differences between self and other, colonization, domination, and violence within developing societies cannot be ignored. In a society, often dominant groups brutally oppress minority ethnicities from their classification systems. Music can be used as a tool to propagate dominant classifications in such societies, and has been used as such by new and developing states especially through control of media systems. Indeed, though music can help define a national identity, authoritarian states can control this musical identity through technology, in that they end up dictating what citizens can listen to. Governments often value music as a symbol, which can be used to promote supra-national entities. They often use this to argue the right to participate in or control a significant cultural or political event, such as Turkey's involvement in the Eurovision Song Contest.

Historically, anthropologists have believed that ethnomusicologists deal with something that by definition cannot be synonymous with the social realities of the present world. In response, ethnomusicologists sometimes present a concept of society that purely exists within an all-encompassing definition of music. Ethnomusicologist Charles Seeger agrees with this, giving an example of how Suya society (in Brazil) can be understood in terms of its music. Seeger notes how "Suya society was an orchestra, its village was a concert hall, and its year a song."

Music helps one understand oneself in relation to people, places, and times. It informs one's sense of physical place—a musical event (such as a collective dance) uniquely evokes collective memories and experiences of place. Both ethnomusicologists and anthropologists believe that music provides the means by which political and moral hierarchies are developed. Music allows people to comprehend both identities and physical places, as well as the boundaries that divide them.

Gender is another area where boundaries are "performed" in music. Instruments and instrumental performance can contribute to a society's definition of gender, in that behaviour of performers conforms to the gender expectations of society (e.g. men should not display effort, or women should feign reluctance to perform). Issues of ethnicity and music intersect with gender studies in fields like historical musicology, the study of popular music, and ethnomusicology. Indeed, gender can be seen as a symbol of social and political order, and controlling gender boundaries is thus a means of controlling such order. Gender boundaries reveal the most deeply intrinsic forms of domination in a society, that subsequently provide a template for other forms of domination. However, music can also provide a means of pushing back against these boundaries by blurring the boundary between what is traditionally considered male and female.

When one listens to foreign music, one tries to make sense of it in terms of one's own (familiar) music and musical worldviews, and this internal struggle can be seen as a power struggle between one's musical views and the other, foreign ones. Sometimes, musicians celebrate ethnic plurality in problematic ways, in that they collect genres, and subsequently alter and reinterpret them in their own terms. Societies often publicize so-called multi-cultural music performances simply for the promotion of their own self-image. Such staged folklore begins to greatly diverge from the celebration of ethnic plurality it purportedly represents, and the music and dance being performed become meaningless when presented so entirely out of context. In such a scenario, which is seen very commonly, the meaning of the performance is both created and controlled by the performers, the audience, and even the media of the society the performance takes place in.

Music rarely remains stable in contexts of social change -- "culture contact" causes music to be altered to whatever new culture it has come in contact with. In this way, minority communities can internalize the outside world through music—a kind of sense-making. They become able to deal with and control a foreign world on their own (musical) terms. Indeed, such integration of musical difference is an integral aspect of the creation of a musical identity, which can be seen in Seeger's description of the Brazilian Suya, who took music from an outside culture and made it their own as an "assertion of identity in a multi-ethnic social situation." In addition, consider the development of East Indian culture. Many of the trademarks of East Indian society, such as the caste system and the Bhojpuri form of the Hindi language, are becoming obsolete, which erodes their concept of ethnic identity. In light of these conditions, music has begun to play an unprecedented role in the concept of East Indian ethnic identity Music can also play a transformative part in the formation of the identities of urban and migrant communities, which can be seen in the diverse and distinct musical cultures in the melting pot of communities in the US. In the case of colonialism, the colonizer and the colonized end up repeatedly exchanging musical ideas. For instance, in the Spanish colonization of the indigenous Native Americans, the resulting mestizo music reflects the intersection of these two culture spheres, and even gave way to new modes of musical expression bearing aspects of both cultures.

Ethnicities and class identities have a complicated relationship. Class can be seen as the relative control a group has over economic (relating to means of production), cultural, political, and social assets in various social areas. In the case of migrant communities, the divide between the concepts of ethnicity and class blur (for instance, one ethnic group/class level provides cheap labor for the other, such as in the case of Latinx Mexican immigrants performing cheap farming labor for White Americans). This blurring can also be seen in Zimbabwe, where White settlers determined a hierarchical social order divided by ethnicity: Blacks, others "coloureds," Asians, and Whites (who were at the top of the hierarchy). The concept of "geographical heritage" (where one cannot change where one's ancestors come from) contributed to this concept of immutability of this constructed hierarchy; White settlers enforced the ranks of this hierarchy through their definition of how "civilized" each ethnic group was (Whites being the most civilized).

However, one cannot simply match a class with a single musical style, as musical styles reflect the complex and often contradictory aspects of the society as a whole. Marxist subcultural theory proposes that subcultures borrow and alter traits from the dominant culture to create a newly diverse range of available traits where the signs of the dominant culture remain, but are now part of a new and simultaneously subversive whole. In fact, ethnicities are similar to classes in many ways. They are often either defined or excluded based on the rules of the dominant classificatory system of the society. Thus, ethnic minorities are forced to figure out how to create their own identities within the control of the dominant classifications. Ethnic minorities can also use music in order to resist and protest the dominant group. This can be seen in European Jews, African Americans, Malaysian-Chinese, and even in the Indonesian-Chinese, who expressed resistance through Chinese theater performances.

Medical Ethnomusicology

Scholars have characterized medical ethnomusicology as "a new field of integrative research and applied practice that explores holistically the roles of music and sound phenomena and related praxes in any cultural and clinical context of health and healing". Medical ethnomusicology often focuses specifically on music and its effect on the biological, psychological, social, emotional, and spiritual realms of health. In this regard, medical ethnomusicologists have found applications of music to combat a broad range of health issues; music has found usage in the treatment of autism, dementia, AIDS and HIV, while also finding use in social and spiritual contexts through the restoration of community and the role of music in prayer and meditation. Recent studies have also shown how music can help to alter mood and serve as cognitive therapy.

Academic programs

Many universities around the world offer ethnomusicology classes and act as centers for ethnomusicological research by the Society of Ethnomusicology lists some graduate and undergraduate degree-granting programs.

In popular culture
Ethnomusicology has been referenced in popular media on occasion. The movie Songcatcher is loosely based on the work of an early ethnomusicologist.

Lydia Tár, the protagonist of the 2023 film Tár, has a PhD in ethnomusicology.

Ethnochoreology

Definition

The definition of ethnochoreology stands to have many similarities with the current way of studying of ethnomusicology. With ethnochoreology's roots in anthropology taken into account, and by the way that it is studied in the field, dance is most accurately defined and studied within this academic circle as two parts: as "an integral part of a network of social events" and "as a part of a system of knowledge and belief, social behavior and aesthetic norms and values". That is, the study of dance in its performance aspects—the physical movements, costumes, stages, performers, and accompanied sound- along with the social context and uses within the society where it takes place.

Beginnings

Because of its growth alongside ethnomusicology, the beginning of ethnochoreology also had a focus on the comparative side of things, where the focus was on classifying different styles based on the movements used and the geographical location in a way not dissimilar to Lomax. This is best shown in "Benesh Notation and Ethnochoreology" in 1967 which was published in the ethnomusicology journal, where Hall advocates using the Benesh notation as a way of documenting dance styles so that it is "possible to compare styles and techniques in detail — even 'schools' within one style — and individual variations in execution from dancer to dancer."
In the seventies and eighties, like with ethnomusicology, ethnochoreology had a focus on a very specific communicative type of "folklore music" performed by small groups and the context and performance aspects of dance were studied and emphasized to be a part of a whole "folkloric dance" that needed to be preserved. This was influenced by the same human centered "thick description" way of study that had moved into ethnomusicology. However, at this time, the sound and dance aspects of the performances studied were still studied and analyzed a bit separately from the context and social aspects of the culture around the dance.

Current

Beginning in the mid eighties, there has been a reflexively interpretive way of writing about dance in culture that is more conscious of the impact of the scholar within the field and how it affects the culture and its relationship with the dance that the scholar is looking into. For example, because most scholars until this point were searching for the most "authentic" folk, there was a lack of study on individual performers, popular dances, and dances of subgroups groups within a culture such as women, youth, and members of the LGBT community. In contrast, this newer wave of study wanted a more open study of dance within a culture. Additionally, there was a shift for a more mutual give and take between the scholar and the subjects, who in field work, also assist the scholars as teachers and informants.

Differences with Ethnomusicology

Although there are many similarities between ethnochoreology and ethnomusicology, there is a large difference between the current geographical scope of released studies. For example, from the beginning of ethnomusicology, there was a large focus on African and Asian musics, due to them seeming to have the most deviation from their norm while ethnochoreology, also beginning in Europe, has long had extensive studies of the Eastern European "folk dances" with relatively little of African and Asian dances, however American studies have delved into Native American and Southeast Asian dance. However, the very basis of this being a difference could be challenged on the basis that many European ethnomusicological and ethnochoreological studies have been done on the "home" folk music and dance in the name of nationalism.

Organizations

, beginning in 1962 as a Folk Dance Commission before giving itself its current name in the early seventies. With the objectives of promoting research, documentation, and interdisciplinary study of dance; providing a forum for cooperation among scholars and students of ethnochoreology by means of international meetings, publications, and correspondence; and contributing to cultural and societal understandings of humanity through the lens of dance, the Study Group meets biennially for a conference.

The , CORD for short, currently known as the Dance Studies Association (DSA) after merging with the Society of Dance History Scholars began 1964. CORD's purposes are stated to be to encourage research in all aspects of dance and related fields;to foster the exchange of ideas, resources, and methodologies through publications, international and regional conferences and workshops; and to promote the accessibility of research materials. CORD publishes a peer-reviewed scholarly journal known as, The Dance Research Journal, twice annually.

See also

For articles on significant individuals in this discipline, see the List of ethnomusicologists.
 Choreomusicology
 Ethnochoreology
 Society for Ethnomusicology
 Fumio Koizumi Prize for Ethnomusicology
 List of musicologists
 List of musicology topics
 Musicology
 Prehistoric music
 Smithsonian Folkways
 Sociomusicology
 World music
 International Council for Traditional Music
 Society for Ethnomusicology

References

Further reading

.

External links
 Society for Ethnomusicology
 International Council for Traditional Music
 British Forum for Ethnomusicology
 International Library of African Music (ILAM)
 The World and Traditional Music Section at the British Library
 The Archives of Traditional Music at Indiana University
 Ethnomusicology, Folk Music, and World Music (University of Washington)
 Outreach Ethnomusicology An Online Ethnomusicology Community and Fieldwork Resource
 SIL publications on Ethnomusicology
 Yale Music Library Research Guide for Ethnomusicology
 Oxford Handbook of Applied Ethnomusicology

 
Dance research